

224001–224100 

|-bgcolor=#fefefe
| 224001 ||  || — || April 4, 2005 || Catalina || CSS || V || align=right data-sort-value="0.82" | 820 m || 
|-id=002 bgcolor=#fefefe
| 224002 ||  || — || April 6, 2005 || Mount Lemmon || Mount Lemmon Survey || — || align=right data-sort-value="0.83" | 830 m || 
|-id=003 bgcolor=#fefefe
| 224003 ||  || — || April 6, 2005 || Catalina || CSS || H || align=right data-sort-value="0.92" | 920 m || 
|-id=004 bgcolor=#FA8072
| 224004 ||  || — || April 4, 2005 || Catalina || CSS || — || align=right | 1.4 km || 
|-id=005 bgcolor=#fefefe
| 224005 ||  || — || April 2, 2005 || Mount Lemmon || Mount Lemmon Survey || — || align=right data-sort-value="0.67" | 670 m || 
|-id=006 bgcolor=#fefefe
| 224006 ||  || — || April 2, 2005 || Mount Lemmon || Mount Lemmon Survey || — || align=right data-sort-value="0.68" | 680 m || 
|-id=007 bgcolor=#fefefe
| 224007 ||  || — || April 4, 2005 || Kitt Peak || Spacewatch || — || align=right data-sort-value="0.81" | 810 m || 
|-id=008 bgcolor=#d6d6d6
| 224008 ||  || — || April 6, 2005 || Kitt Peak || Spacewatch || 3:2 || align=right | 5.0 km || 
|-id=009 bgcolor=#fefefe
| 224009 ||  || — || April 6, 2005 || Mount Lemmon || Mount Lemmon Survey || — || align=right data-sort-value="0.78" | 780 m || 
|-id=010 bgcolor=#fefefe
| 224010 ||  || — || April 7, 2005 || Kitt Peak || Spacewatch || — || align=right | 1.0 km || 
|-id=011 bgcolor=#d6d6d6
| 224011 ||  || — || April 9, 2005 || Socorro || LINEAR || HIL3:2 || align=right | 9.6 km || 
|-id=012 bgcolor=#fefefe
| 224012 ||  || — || April 10, 2005 || Mount Lemmon || Mount Lemmon Survey || — || align=right data-sort-value="0.90" | 900 m || 
|-id=013 bgcolor=#fefefe
| 224013 ||  || — || May 3, 2005 || Socorro || LINEAR || — || align=right | 1.2 km || 
|-id=014 bgcolor=#fefefe
| 224014 ||  || — || May 3, 2005 || Kitt Peak || Spacewatch || — || align=right data-sort-value="0.77" | 770 m || 
|-id=015 bgcolor=#fefefe
| 224015 ||  || — || May 4, 2005 || Mount Lemmon || Mount Lemmon Survey || — || align=right data-sort-value="0.91" | 910 m || 
|-id=016 bgcolor=#fefefe
| 224016 ||  || — || May 8, 2005 || Mount Lemmon || Mount Lemmon Survey || — || align=right data-sort-value="0.82" | 820 m || 
|-id=017 bgcolor=#fefefe
| 224017 ||  || — || May 4, 2005 || Kitt Peak || Spacewatch || — || align=right data-sort-value="0.68" | 680 m || 
|-id=018 bgcolor=#fefefe
| 224018 ||  || — || May 4, 2005 || Palomar || NEAT || — || align=right | 1.0 km || 
|-id=019 bgcolor=#fefefe
| 224019 ||  || — || May 10, 2005 || Mount Lemmon || Mount Lemmon Survey || — || align=right data-sort-value="0.99" | 990 m || 
|-id=020 bgcolor=#C2FFFF
| 224020 ||  || — || May 7, 2005 || Mount Lemmon || Mount Lemmon Survey || L4 || align=right | 17 km || 
|-id=021 bgcolor=#fefefe
| 224021 ||  || — || May 16, 2005 || Mount Lemmon || Mount Lemmon Survey || — || align=right data-sort-value="0.84" | 840 m || 
|-id=022 bgcolor=#fefefe
| 224022 ||  || — || May 20, 2005 || Siding Spring || SSS || — || align=right | 3.0 km || 
|-id=023 bgcolor=#fefefe
| 224023 ||  || — || June 3, 2005 || Kitt Peak || Spacewatch || — || align=right | 1.1 km || 
|-id=024 bgcolor=#fefefe
| 224024 ||  || — || June 4, 2005 || Socorro || LINEAR || — || align=right | 1.0 km || 
|-id=025 bgcolor=#fefefe
| 224025 ||  || — || June 5, 2005 || Kitt Peak || Spacewatch || — || align=right | 1.1 km || 
|-id=026 bgcolor=#fefefe
| 224026 ||  || — || June 5, 2005 || Socorro || LINEAR || — || align=right | 1.1 km || 
|-id=027 bgcolor=#fefefe
| 224027 Grégoire ||  ||  || June 10, 2005 || Vicques || M. Ory || NYS || align=right | 1.0 km || 
|-id=028 bgcolor=#fefefe
| 224028 ||  || — || June 4, 2005 || Socorro || LINEAR || PHO || align=right | 1.2 km || 
|-id=029 bgcolor=#fefefe
| 224029 ||  || — || June 10, 2005 || Kitt Peak || Spacewatch || — || align=right | 1.1 km || 
|-id=030 bgcolor=#fefefe
| 224030 ||  || — || June 11, 2005 || Catalina || CSS || — || align=right | 2.1 km || 
|-id=031 bgcolor=#fefefe
| 224031 ||  || — || June 12, 2005 || Kitt Peak || Spacewatch || NYS || align=right | 1.0 km || 
|-id=032 bgcolor=#fefefe
| 224032 ||  || — || June 13, 2005 || Kitt Peak || Spacewatch || FLO || align=right data-sort-value="0.91" | 910 m || 
|-id=033 bgcolor=#fefefe
| 224033 ||  || — || June 13, 2005 || Mount Lemmon || Mount Lemmon Survey || MAS || align=right data-sort-value="0.90" | 900 m || 
|-id=034 bgcolor=#fefefe
| 224034 ||  || — || June 10, 2005 || Reedy Creek || J. Broughton || — || align=right | 1.4 km || 
|-id=035 bgcolor=#fefefe
| 224035 ||  || — || June 5, 2005 || Kitt Peak || Spacewatch || FLO || align=right | 1.0 km || 
|-id=036 bgcolor=#fefefe
| 224036 || 2005 MS || — || June 17, 2005 || Mount Lemmon || Mount Lemmon Survey || NYS || align=right data-sort-value="0.89" | 890 m || 
|-id=037 bgcolor=#fefefe
| 224037 ||  || — || June 25, 2005 || Palomar || NEAT || — || align=right | 1.5 km || 
|-id=038 bgcolor=#fefefe
| 224038 ||  || — || June 17, 2005 || Mount Lemmon || Mount Lemmon Survey || MAS || align=right data-sort-value="0.81" | 810 m || 
|-id=039 bgcolor=#fefefe
| 224039 ||  || — || June 24, 2005 || Palomar || NEAT || — || align=right | 1.2 km || 
|-id=040 bgcolor=#fefefe
| 224040 ||  || — || June 28, 2005 || Kitt Peak || Spacewatch || CLA || align=right | 2.4 km || 
|-id=041 bgcolor=#fefefe
| 224041 ||  || — || June 28, 2005 || Palomar || NEAT || V || align=right | 1.0 km || 
|-id=042 bgcolor=#fefefe
| 224042 ||  || — || June 28, 2005 || Palomar || NEAT || V || align=right data-sort-value="0.87" | 870 m || 
|-id=043 bgcolor=#fefefe
| 224043 ||  || — || June 28, 2005 || Mount Lemmon || Mount Lemmon Survey || — || align=right | 1.1 km || 
|-id=044 bgcolor=#fefefe
| 224044 ||  || — || June 28, 2005 || Palomar || NEAT || MAS || align=right data-sort-value="0.85" | 850 m || 
|-id=045 bgcolor=#fefefe
| 224045 ||  || — || June 29, 2005 || Catalina || CSS || NYS || align=right data-sort-value="0.79" | 790 m || 
|-id=046 bgcolor=#fefefe
| 224046 ||  || — || June 30, 2005 || Catalina || CSS || — || align=right | 1.2 km || 
|-id=047 bgcolor=#fefefe
| 224047 ||  || — || June 29, 2005 || Kitt Peak || Spacewatch || FLO || align=right data-sort-value="0.72" | 720 m || 
|-id=048 bgcolor=#fefefe
| 224048 ||  || — || June 30, 2005 || Kitt Peak || Spacewatch || MAS || align=right data-sort-value="0.86" | 860 m || 
|-id=049 bgcolor=#fefefe
| 224049 ||  || — || June 30, 2005 || Kitt Peak || Spacewatch || — || align=right | 1.2 km || 
|-id=050 bgcolor=#fefefe
| 224050 ||  || — || June 30, 2005 || Kitt Peak || Spacewatch || FLO || align=right data-sort-value="0.88" | 880 m || 
|-id=051 bgcolor=#fefefe
| 224051 ||  || — || June 28, 2005 || Palomar || NEAT || ERI || align=right | 2.7 km || 
|-id=052 bgcolor=#fefefe
| 224052 ||  || — || June 28, 2005 || Palomar || NEAT || — || align=right | 1.2 km || 
|-id=053 bgcolor=#fefefe
| 224053 ||  || — || June 27, 2005 || Palomar || NEAT || V || align=right | 1.1 km || 
|-id=054 bgcolor=#fefefe
| 224054 ||  || — || June 30, 2005 || Kitt Peak || Spacewatch || — || align=right | 1.1 km || 
|-id=055 bgcolor=#fefefe
| 224055 ||  || — || June 30, 2005 || Kitt Peak || Spacewatch || V || align=right data-sort-value="0.88" | 880 m || 
|-id=056 bgcolor=#fefefe
| 224056 ||  || — || June 30, 2005 || Anderson Mesa || LONEOS || — || align=right data-sort-value="0.99" | 990 m || 
|-id=057 bgcolor=#fefefe
| 224057 ||  || — || June 16, 2005 || Siding Spring || SSS || — || align=right | 1.7 km || 
|-id=058 bgcolor=#fefefe
| 224058 ||  || — || June 17, 2005 || Mount Lemmon || Mount Lemmon Survey || NYS || align=right data-sort-value="0.83" | 830 m || 
|-id=059 bgcolor=#fefefe
| 224059 ||  || — || July 2, 2005 || Kitt Peak || Spacewatch || MAS || align=right data-sort-value="0.66" | 660 m || 
|-id=060 bgcolor=#fefefe
| 224060 ||  || — || July 1, 2005 || Kitt Peak || Spacewatch || V || align=right data-sort-value="0.94" | 940 m || 
|-id=061 bgcolor=#fefefe
| 224061 ||  || — || July 1, 2005 || Kitt Peak || Spacewatch || V || align=right data-sort-value="0.87" | 870 m || 
|-id=062 bgcolor=#fefefe
| 224062 ||  || — || July 3, 2005 || Mount Lemmon || Mount Lemmon Survey || MAS || align=right data-sort-value="0.76" | 760 m || 
|-id=063 bgcolor=#fefefe
| 224063 ||  || — || July 3, 2005 || Mount Lemmon || Mount Lemmon Survey || — || align=right | 1.0 km || 
|-id=064 bgcolor=#fefefe
| 224064 ||  || — || July 5, 2005 || Mount Lemmon || Mount Lemmon Survey || NYS || align=right data-sort-value="0.80" | 800 m || 
|-id=065 bgcolor=#fefefe
| 224065 ||  || — || July 1, 2005 || Kitt Peak || Spacewatch || — || align=right data-sort-value="0.94" | 940 m || 
|-id=066 bgcolor=#fefefe
| 224066 ||  || — || July 5, 2005 || Palomar || NEAT || NYS || align=right data-sort-value="0.78" | 780 m || 
|-id=067 bgcolor=#fefefe
| 224067 Colemila ||  ||  || July 8, 2005 || Wrightwood || J. W. Young || — || align=right | 2.4 km || 
|-id=068 bgcolor=#fefefe
| 224068 ||  || — || July 3, 2005 || Mount Lemmon || Mount Lemmon Survey || MAS || align=right data-sort-value="0.95" | 950 m || 
|-id=069 bgcolor=#fefefe
| 224069 ||  || — || July 5, 2005 || Palomar || NEAT || — || align=right | 1.0 km || 
|-id=070 bgcolor=#fefefe
| 224070 ||  || — || July 6, 2005 || Kitt Peak || Spacewatch || — || align=right | 1.2 km || 
|-id=071 bgcolor=#fefefe
| 224071 ||  || — || July 6, 2005 || Kitt Peak || Spacewatch || — || align=right data-sort-value="0.94" | 940 m || 
|-id=072 bgcolor=#fefefe
| 224072 ||  || — || July 1, 2005 || Kitt Peak || Spacewatch || FLO || align=right data-sort-value="0.79" | 790 m || 
|-id=073 bgcolor=#fefefe
| 224073 ||  || — || July 5, 2005 || Palomar || NEAT || — || align=right | 1.1 km || 
|-id=074 bgcolor=#fefefe
| 224074 ||  || — || July 10, 2005 || Kitt Peak || Spacewatch || FLO || align=right data-sort-value="0.89" | 890 m || 
|-id=075 bgcolor=#fefefe
| 224075 ||  || — || July 9, 2005 || Reedy Creek || J. Broughton || FLO || align=right data-sort-value="0.97" | 970 m || 
|-id=076 bgcolor=#fefefe
| 224076 ||  || — || July 11, 2005 || Anderson Mesa || LONEOS || ERI || align=right | 3.0 km || 
|-id=077 bgcolor=#fefefe
| 224077 ||  || — || July 11, 2005 || Kitt Peak || Spacewatch || — || align=right data-sort-value="0.87" | 870 m || 
|-id=078 bgcolor=#fefefe
| 224078 ||  || — || July 1, 2005 || Kitt Peak || Spacewatch || — || align=right data-sort-value="0.83" | 830 m || 
|-id=079 bgcolor=#fefefe
| 224079 ||  || — || July 4, 2005 || Palomar || NEAT || NYS || align=right data-sort-value="0.95" | 950 m || 
|-id=080 bgcolor=#fefefe
| 224080 ||  || — || July 5, 2005 || Mount Lemmon || Mount Lemmon Survey || NYS || align=right data-sort-value="0.73" | 730 m || 
|-id=081 bgcolor=#fefefe
| 224081 ||  || — || July 9, 2005 || Kitt Peak || Spacewatch || — || align=right | 1.0 km || 
|-id=082 bgcolor=#fefefe
| 224082 ||  || — || July 10, 2005 || Reedy Creek || J. Broughton || V || align=right data-sort-value="0.92" | 920 m || 
|-id=083 bgcolor=#fefefe
| 224083 ||  || — || July 13, 2005 || Reedy Creek || J. Broughton || — || align=right | 1.2 km || 
|-id=084 bgcolor=#fefefe
| 224084 ||  || — || July 1, 2005 || Kitt Peak || Spacewatch || — || align=right data-sort-value="0.88" | 880 m || 
|-id=085 bgcolor=#fefefe
| 224085 ||  || — || July 2, 2005 || Catalina || CSS || — || align=right | 1.4 km || 
|-id=086 bgcolor=#fefefe
| 224086 ||  || — || July 2, 2005 || Catalina || CSS || V || align=right | 1.2 km || 
|-id=087 bgcolor=#fefefe
| 224087 ||  || — || July 3, 2005 || Catalina || CSS || — || align=right | 1.2 km || 
|-id=088 bgcolor=#fefefe
| 224088 ||  || — || July 11, 2005 || Catalina || CSS || — || align=right | 1.4 km || 
|-id=089 bgcolor=#fefefe
| 224089 ||  || — || July 1, 2005 || Anderson Mesa || LONEOS || — || align=right | 1.5 km || 
|-id=090 bgcolor=#fefefe
| 224090 ||  || — || July 10, 2005 || Kitt Peak || Spacewatch || — || align=right data-sort-value="0.94" | 940 m || 
|-id=091 bgcolor=#fefefe
| 224091 ||  || — || July 27, 2005 || Palomar || NEAT || — || align=right | 1.0 km || 
|-id=092 bgcolor=#fefefe
| 224092 ||  || — || July 26, 2005 || Palomar || NEAT || — || align=right | 1.4 km || 
|-id=093 bgcolor=#fefefe
| 224093 ||  || — || July 27, 2005 || Palomar || NEAT || — || align=right | 1.3 km || 
|-id=094 bgcolor=#fefefe
| 224094 ||  || — || July 28, 2005 || Palomar || NEAT || — || align=right | 1.1 km || 
|-id=095 bgcolor=#fefefe
| 224095 ||  || — || July 29, 2005 || Palomar || NEAT || NYS || align=right data-sort-value="0.84" | 840 m || 
|-id=096 bgcolor=#fefefe
| 224096 ||  || — || July 29, 2005 || Palomar || NEAT || MAS || align=right data-sort-value="0.97" | 970 m || 
|-id=097 bgcolor=#fefefe
| 224097 ||  || — || July 29, 2005 || Siding Spring || SSS || — || align=right | 2.5 km || 
|-id=098 bgcolor=#fefefe
| 224098 ||  || — || July 29, 2005 || Reedy Creek || J. Broughton || — || align=right | 1.5 km || 
|-id=099 bgcolor=#fefefe
| 224099 ||  || — || July 29, 2005 || Palomar || NEAT || MAS || align=right | 1.1 km || 
|-id=100 bgcolor=#fefefe
| 224100 ||  || — || July 31, 2005 || Palomar || NEAT || — || align=right data-sort-value="0.96" | 960 m || 
|}

224101–224200 

|-bgcolor=#fefefe
| 224101 ||  || — || July 28, 2005 || Palomar || NEAT || — || align=right | 1.3 km || 
|-id=102 bgcolor=#fefefe
| 224102 ||  || — || July 29, 2005 || Palomar || NEAT || — || align=right | 1.1 km || 
|-id=103 bgcolor=#fefefe
| 224103 ||  || — || July 30, 2005 || Palomar || NEAT || — || align=right data-sort-value="0.96" | 960 m || 
|-id=104 bgcolor=#fefefe
| 224104 ||  || — || July 30, 2005 || Palomar || NEAT || NYS || align=right data-sort-value="0.85" | 850 m || 
|-id=105 bgcolor=#fefefe
| 224105 ||  || — || August 2, 2005 || Socorro || LINEAR || MAS || align=right | 1.1 km || 
|-id=106 bgcolor=#fefefe
| 224106 ||  || — || August 2, 2005 || Socorro || LINEAR || — || align=right | 2.0 km || 
|-id=107 bgcolor=#fefefe
| 224107 ||  || — || August 2, 2005 || Socorro || LINEAR || NYS || align=right data-sort-value="0.84" | 840 m || 
|-id=108 bgcolor=#fefefe
| 224108 ||  || — || August 2, 2005 || Socorro || LINEAR || — || align=right | 1.0 km || 
|-id=109 bgcolor=#fefefe
| 224109 ||  || — || August 4, 2005 || Palomar || NEAT || MAS || align=right | 1.1 km || 
|-id=110 bgcolor=#fefefe
| 224110 ||  || — || August 6, 2005 || Reedy Creek || J. Broughton || NYS || align=right data-sort-value="0.92" | 920 m || 
|-id=111 bgcolor=#fefefe
| 224111 ||  || — || August 4, 2005 || Palomar || NEAT || — || align=right | 1.3 km || 
|-id=112 bgcolor=#fefefe
| 224112 ||  || — || August 4, 2005 || Palomar || NEAT || MAS || align=right | 1.1 km || 
|-id=113 bgcolor=#fefefe
| 224113 ||  || — || August 4, 2005 || Palomar || NEAT || — || align=right | 1.1 km || 
|-id=114 bgcolor=#fefefe
| 224114 ||  || — || August 4, 2005 || Palomar || NEAT || — || align=right | 2.3 km || 
|-id=115 bgcolor=#fefefe
| 224115 ||  || — || August 11, 2005 || Reedy Creek || J. Broughton || — || align=right | 1.2 km || 
|-id=116 bgcolor=#fefefe
| 224116 ||  || — || August 24, 2005 || Palomar || NEAT || — || align=right data-sort-value="0.87" | 870 m || 
|-id=117 bgcolor=#fefefe
| 224117 ||  || — || August 24, 2005 || Palomar || NEAT || NYS || align=right data-sort-value="0.82" | 820 m || 
|-id=118 bgcolor=#fefefe
| 224118 ||  || — || August 24, 2005 || Palomar || NEAT || — || align=right | 1.2 km || 
|-id=119 bgcolor=#fefefe
| 224119 ||  || — || August 24, 2005 || Palomar || NEAT || FLO || align=right data-sort-value="0.99" | 990 m || 
|-id=120 bgcolor=#fefefe
| 224120 ||  || — || August 25, 2005 || Palomar || NEAT || NYS || align=right data-sort-value="0.93" | 930 m || 
|-id=121 bgcolor=#fefefe
| 224121 ||  || — || August 25, 2005 || Campo Imperatore || CINEOS || — || align=right data-sort-value="0.83" | 830 m || 
|-id=122 bgcolor=#fefefe
| 224122 ||  || — || August 27, 2005 || Junk Bond || D. Healy || — || align=right | 1.2 km || 
|-id=123 bgcolor=#fefefe
| 224123 ||  || — || August 24, 2005 || Palomar || NEAT || V || align=right data-sort-value="0.86" | 860 m || 
|-id=124 bgcolor=#fefefe
| 224124 ||  || — || August 24, 2005 || Palomar || NEAT || V || align=right | 1.2 km || 
|-id=125 bgcolor=#fefefe
| 224125 ||  || — || August 25, 2005 || Palomar || NEAT || MAS || align=right data-sort-value="0.89" | 890 m || 
|-id=126 bgcolor=#fefefe
| 224126 ||  || — || August 25, 2005 || Palomar || NEAT || — || align=right | 1.1 km || 
|-id=127 bgcolor=#fefefe
| 224127 ||  || — || August 25, 2005 || Palomar || NEAT || MAS || align=right | 1.1 km || 
|-id=128 bgcolor=#fefefe
| 224128 ||  || — || August 25, 2005 || Palomar || NEAT || MAS || align=right | 1.0 km || 
|-id=129 bgcolor=#fefefe
| 224129 ||  || — || August 26, 2005 || Anderson Mesa || LONEOS || NYS || align=right | 2.7 km || 
|-id=130 bgcolor=#fefefe
| 224130 ||  || — || August 27, 2005 || Kitt Peak || Spacewatch || — || align=right | 1.0 km || 
|-id=131 bgcolor=#fefefe
| 224131 ||  || — || August 28, 2005 || Vicques || M. Ory || NYS || align=right data-sort-value="0.87" | 870 m || 
|-id=132 bgcolor=#fefefe
| 224132 ||  || — || August 25, 2005 || Palomar || NEAT || NYS || align=right data-sort-value="0.76" | 760 m || 
|-id=133 bgcolor=#fefefe
| 224133 ||  || — || August 25, 2005 || Palomar || NEAT || NYS || align=right data-sort-value="0.89" | 890 m || 
|-id=134 bgcolor=#fefefe
| 224134 ||  || — || August 25, 2005 || Palomar || NEAT || MAS || align=right data-sort-value="0.93" | 930 m || 
|-id=135 bgcolor=#fefefe
| 224135 ||  || — || August 25, 2005 || Palomar || NEAT || — || align=right | 1.3 km || 
|-id=136 bgcolor=#fefefe
| 224136 ||  || — || August 25, 2005 || Palomar || NEAT || NYS || align=right | 1.1 km || 
|-id=137 bgcolor=#fefefe
| 224137 ||  || — || August 26, 2005 || Palomar || NEAT || V || align=right | 1.1 km || 
|-id=138 bgcolor=#fefefe
| 224138 ||  || — || August 26, 2005 || Palomar || NEAT || V || align=right data-sort-value="0.89" | 890 m || 
|-id=139 bgcolor=#fefefe
| 224139 ||  || — || August 26, 2005 || Anderson Mesa || LONEOS || V || align=right data-sort-value="0.93" | 930 m || 
|-id=140 bgcolor=#fefefe
| 224140 ||  || — || August 26, 2005 || Anderson Mesa || LONEOS || MAS || align=right | 1.0 km || 
|-id=141 bgcolor=#fefefe
| 224141 ||  || — || August 26, 2005 || Palomar || NEAT || — || align=right | 1.2 km || 
|-id=142 bgcolor=#fefefe
| 224142 ||  || — || August 26, 2005 || Palomar || NEAT || NYS || align=right | 1.1 km || 
|-id=143 bgcolor=#fefefe
| 224143 ||  || — || August 26, 2005 || Palomar || NEAT || — || align=right | 1.1 km || 
|-id=144 bgcolor=#fefefe
| 224144 ||  || — || August 26, 2005 || Palomar || NEAT || MAS || align=right | 1.1 km || 
|-id=145 bgcolor=#fefefe
| 224145 ||  || — || August 26, 2005 || Palomar || NEAT || NYS || align=right | 1.2 km || 
|-id=146 bgcolor=#fefefe
| 224146 ||  || — || August 26, 2005 || Palomar || NEAT || NYS || align=right | 1.0 km || 
|-id=147 bgcolor=#fefefe
| 224147 ||  || — || August 26, 2005 || Campo Imperatore || CINEOS || — || align=right | 1.1 km || 
|-id=148 bgcolor=#fefefe
| 224148 ||  || — || August 27, 2005 || Anderson Mesa || LONEOS || NYS || align=right data-sort-value="0.89" | 890 m || 
|-id=149 bgcolor=#fefefe
| 224149 ||  || — || August 28, 2005 || Kitt Peak || Spacewatch || — || align=right | 1.0 km || 
|-id=150 bgcolor=#fefefe
| 224150 ||  || — || August 28, 2005 || Anderson Mesa || LONEOS || V || align=right | 1.0 km || 
|-id=151 bgcolor=#fefefe
| 224151 ||  || — || August 26, 2005 || Anderson Mesa || LONEOS || — || align=right | 1.4 km || 
|-id=152 bgcolor=#fefefe
| 224152 ||  || — || August 26, 2005 || Palomar || NEAT || MAS || align=right data-sort-value="0.96" | 960 m || 
|-id=153 bgcolor=#fefefe
| 224153 ||  || — || August 26, 2005 || Palomar || NEAT || NYS || align=right data-sort-value="0.97" | 970 m || 
|-id=154 bgcolor=#fefefe
| 224154 ||  || — || August 26, 2005 || Palomar || NEAT || — || align=right | 1.2 km || 
|-id=155 bgcolor=#fefefe
| 224155 ||  || — || August 27, 2005 || Anderson Mesa || LONEOS || — || align=right data-sort-value="0.99" | 990 m || 
|-id=156 bgcolor=#fefefe
| 224156 ||  || — || August 28, 2005 || Kitt Peak || Spacewatch || — || align=right | 1.2 km || 
|-id=157 bgcolor=#fefefe
| 224157 ||  || — || August 28, 2005 || Siding Spring || SSS || MAS || align=right data-sort-value="0.88" | 880 m || 
|-id=158 bgcolor=#fefefe
| 224158 ||  || — || August 29, 2005 || Anderson Mesa || LONEOS || NYS || align=right | 1.1 km || 
|-id=159 bgcolor=#fefefe
| 224159 ||  || — || August 29, 2005 || Anderson Mesa || LONEOS || — || align=right | 3.4 km || 
|-id=160 bgcolor=#fefefe
| 224160 ||  || — || August 25, 2005 || Kingsnake || J. V. McClusky || — || align=right | 1.3 km || 
|-id=161 bgcolor=#fefefe
| 224161 ||  || — || August 30, 2005 || Socorro || LINEAR || NYS || align=right data-sort-value="0.96" | 960 m || 
|-id=162 bgcolor=#fefefe
| 224162 ||  || — || August 30, 2005 || Kitt Peak || Spacewatch || — || align=right | 1.1 km || 
|-id=163 bgcolor=#fefefe
| 224163 ||  || — || August 24, 2005 || Palomar || NEAT || NYS || align=right data-sort-value="0.93" | 930 m || 
|-id=164 bgcolor=#E9E9E9
| 224164 ||  || — || August 26, 2005 || Palomar || NEAT || — || align=right | 1.0 km || 
|-id=165 bgcolor=#fefefe
| 224165 ||  || — || August 27, 2005 || Palomar || NEAT || MAS || align=right | 1.1 km || 
|-id=166 bgcolor=#fefefe
| 224166 ||  || — || August 27, 2005 || Palomar || NEAT || — || align=right | 1.2 km || 
|-id=167 bgcolor=#fefefe
| 224167 ||  || — || August 27, 2005 || Palomar || NEAT || — || align=right | 1.3 km || 
|-id=168 bgcolor=#E9E9E9
| 224168 ||  || — || August 27, 2005 || Palomar || NEAT || — || align=right | 2.2 km || 
|-id=169 bgcolor=#fefefe
| 224169 ||  || — || August 27, 2005 || Palomar || NEAT || — || align=right | 1.1 km || 
|-id=170 bgcolor=#fefefe
| 224170 ||  || — || August 27, 2005 || Palomar || NEAT || — || align=right | 1.4 km || 
|-id=171 bgcolor=#fefefe
| 224171 ||  || — || August 27, 2005 || Palomar || NEAT || NYS || align=right data-sort-value="0.90" | 900 m || 
|-id=172 bgcolor=#fefefe
| 224172 ||  || — || August 27, 2005 || Palomar || NEAT || SUL || align=right | 2.0 km || 
|-id=173 bgcolor=#fefefe
| 224173 ||  || — || August 27, 2005 || Palomar || NEAT || MAS || align=right data-sort-value="0.82" | 820 m || 
|-id=174 bgcolor=#fefefe
| 224174 ||  || — || August 27, 2005 || Palomar || NEAT || — || align=right | 1.0 km || 
|-id=175 bgcolor=#fefefe
| 224175 ||  || — || August 28, 2005 || Kitt Peak || Spacewatch || NYS || align=right data-sort-value="0.92" | 920 m || 
|-id=176 bgcolor=#fefefe
| 224176 ||  || — || August 28, 2005 || Kitt Peak || Spacewatch || — || align=right data-sort-value="0.88" | 880 m || 
|-id=177 bgcolor=#fefefe
| 224177 ||  || — || August 29, 2005 || Socorro || LINEAR || — || align=right | 1.1 km || 
|-id=178 bgcolor=#fefefe
| 224178 ||  || — || August 30, 2005 || Kitt Peak || Spacewatch || MAS || align=right data-sort-value="0.91" | 910 m || 
|-id=179 bgcolor=#fefefe
| 224179 ||  || — || August 27, 2005 || Palomar || NEAT || V || align=right | 1.1 km || 
|-id=180 bgcolor=#fefefe
| 224180 ||  || — || August 26, 2005 || Palomar || NEAT || V || align=right | 1.1 km || 
|-id=181 bgcolor=#fefefe
| 224181 ||  || — || August 26, 2005 || Palomar || NEAT || V || align=right data-sort-value="0.92" | 920 m || 
|-id=182 bgcolor=#fefefe
| 224182 ||  || — || August 30, 2005 || Anderson Mesa || LONEOS || — || align=right | 1.4 km || 
|-id=183 bgcolor=#E9E9E9
| 224183 ||  || — || August 31, 2005 || Socorro || LINEAR || — || align=right | 1.8 km || 
|-id=184 bgcolor=#fefefe
| 224184 ||  || — || August 31, 2005 || Kitt Peak || Spacewatch || MAS || align=right | 1.3 km || 
|-id=185 bgcolor=#fefefe
| 224185 ||  || — || August 31, 2005 || Kitt Peak || Spacewatch || MAS || align=right data-sort-value="0.79" | 790 m || 
|-id=186 bgcolor=#fefefe
| 224186 ||  || — || August 29, 2005 || Socorro || LINEAR || MAS || align=right | 1.1 km || 
|-id=187 bgcolor=#fefefe
| 224187 ||  || — || August 30, 2005 || Kitt Peak || Spacewatch || — || align=right data-sort-value="0.98" | 980 m || 
|-id=188 bgcolor=#fefefe
| 224188 ||  || — || September 7, 2005 || Altschwendt || Altschwendt Obs. || — || align=right data-sort-value="0.98" | 980 m || 
|-id=189 bgcolor=#fefefe
| 224189 ||  || — || September 6, 2005 || Anderson Mesa || LONEOS || — || align=right data-sort-value="0.99" | 990 m || 
|-id=190 bgcolor=#fefefe
| 224190 ||  || — || September 6, 2005 || Anderson Mesa || LONEOS || — || align=right | 2.8 km || 
|-id=191 bgcolor=#fefefe
| 224191 ||  || — || September 8, 2005 || Socorro || LINEAR || MAS || align=right | 1.2 km || 
|-id=192 bgcolor=#fefefe
| 224192 ||  || — || September 9, 2005 || Socorro || LINEAR || — || align=right | 1.2 km || 
|-id=193 bgcolor=#fefefe
| 224193 ||  || — || September 8, 2005 || Socorro || LINEAR || NYS || align=right data-sort-value="0.81" | 810 m || 
|-id=194 bgcolor=#fefefe
| 224194 ||  || — || September 1, 2005 || Palomar || NEAT || — || align=right | 1.2 km || 
|-id=195 bgcolor=#fefefe
| 224195 ||  || — || September 1, 2005 || Palomar || NEAT || V || align=right | 1.1 km || 
|-id=196 bgcolor=#fefefe
| 224196 ||  || — || September 6, 2005 || Anderson Mesa || LONEOS || V || align=right | 1.0 km || 
|-id=197 bgcolor=#fefefe
| 224197 ||  || — || September 6, 2005 || Anderson Mesa || LONEOS || MAS || align=right | 1.3 km || 
|-id=198 bgcolor=#E9E9E9
| 224198 ||  || — || September 8, 2005 || Socorro || LINEAR || — || align=right | 2.3 km || 
|-id=199 bgcolor=#fefefe
| 224199 ||  || — || September 11, 2005 || Socorro || LINEAR || LCI || align=right | 1.8 km || 
|-id=200 bgcolor=#fefefe
| 224200 ||  || — || September 6, 2005 || Socorro || LINEAR || NYS || align=right data-sort-value="0.75" | 750 m || 
|}

224201–224300 

|-bgcolor=#fefefe
| 224201 ||  || — || September 12, 2005 || Jarnac || Jarnac Obs. || — || align=right | 1.0 km || 
|-id=202 bgcolor=#fefefe
| 224202 ||  || — || September 12, 2005 || Haleakala || NEAT || — || align=right | 1.5 km || 
|-id=203 bgcolor=#E9E9E9
| 224203 ||  || — || September 13, 2005 || Anderson Mesa || LONEOS || — || align=right | 4.2 km || 
|-id=204 bgcolor=#fefefe
| 224204 ||  || — || September 1, 2005 || Kitt Peak || Spacewatch || MAS || align=right data-sort-value="0.70" | 700 m || 
|-id=205 bgcolor=#fefefe
| 224205 ||  || — || September 5, 2005 || Catalina || CSS || NYS || align=right data-sort-value="0.91" | 910 m || 
|-id=206 bgcolor=#fefefe
| 224206 Pietchisson || 2005 SY ||  || September 21, 2005 || Vicques || M. Ory || — || align=right | 1.2 km || 
|-id=207 bgcolor=#fefefe
| 224207 ||  || — || September 24, 2005 || Kitt Peak || Spacewatch || — || align=right | 1.2 km || 
|-id=208 bgcolor=#fefefe
| 224208 ||  || — || September 26, 2005 || Kitt Peak || Spacewatch || — || align=right | 1.2 km || 
|-id=209 bgcolor=#E9E9E9
| 224209 ||  || — || September 26, 2005 || Kitt Peak || Spacewatch || — || align=right | 2.8 km || 
|-id=210 bgcolor=#E9E9E9
| 224210 ||  || — || September 24, 2005 || Kitt Peak || Spacewatch || AEO || align=right | 1.8 km || 
|-id=211 bgcolor=#E9E9E9
| 224211 ||  || — || September 28, 2005 || Great Shefford || P. Birtwhistle || — || align=right | 1.4 km || 
|-id=212 bgcolor=#fefefe
| 224212 ||  || — || September 23, 2005 || Catalina || CSS || MAS || align=right | 1.2 km || 
|-id=213 bgcolor=#fefefe
| 224213 ||  || — || September 23, 2005 || Catalina || CSS || — || align=right | 1.1 km || 
|-id=214 bgcolor=#E9E9E9
| 224214 ||  || — || September 23, 2005 || Kitt Peak || Spacewatch || — || align=right | 1.1 km || 
|-id=215 bgcolor=#E9E9E9
| 224215 ||  || — || September 23, 2005 || Kitt Peak || Spacewatch || — || align=right data-sort-value="0.96" | 960 m || 
|-id=216 bgcolor=#E9E9E9
| 224216 ||  || — || September 23, 2005 || Kitt Peak || Spacewatch || — || align=right | 1.7 km || 
|-id=217 bgcolor=#fefefe
| 224217 ||  || — || September 24, 2005 || Kitt Peak || Spacewatch || — || align=right | 1.0 km || 
|-id=218 bgcolor=#fefefe
| 224218 ||  || — || September 24, 2005 || Kitt Peak || Spacewatch || — || align=right | 1.3 km || 
|-id=219 bgcolor=#fefefe
| 224219 ||  || — || September 24, 2005 || Kitt Peak || Spacewatch || MAS || align=right data-sort-value="0.81" | 810 m || 
|-id=220 bgcolor=#E9E9E9
| 224220 ||  || — || September 24, 2005 || Kitt Peak || Spacewatch || — || align=right | 1.0 km || 
|-id=221 bgcolor=#fefefe
| 224221 ||  || — || September 25, 2005 || Kitt Peak || Spacewatch || MAS || align=right data-sort-value="0.92" | 920 m || 
|-id=222 bgcolor=#fefefe
| 224222 ||  || — || September 25, 2005 || Kitt Peak || Spacewatch || MAS || align=right | 1.0 km || 
|-id=223 bgcolor=#fefefe
| 224223 ||  || — || September 25, 2005 || Catalina || CSS || — || align=right | 1.1 km || 
|-id=224 bgcolor=#E9E9E9
| 224224 ||  || — || September 25, 2005 || Kitt Peak || Spacewatch || — || align=right | 1.3 km || 
|-id=225 bgcolor=#fefefe
| 224225 ||  || — || September 26, 2005 || Kitt Peak || Spacewatch || MAS || align=right data-sort-value="0.90" | 900 m || 
|-id=226 bgcolor=#E9E9E9
| 224226 ||  || — || September 26, 2005 || Kitt Peak || Spacewatch || — || align=right | 1.7 km || 
|-id=227 bgcolor=#E9E9E9
| 224227 ||  || — || September 26, 2005 || Kitt Peak || Spacewatch || — || align=right | 1.6 km || 
|-id=228 bgcolor=#E9E9E9
| 224228 ||  || — || September 26, 2005 || Palomar || NEAT || — || align=right | 1.5 km || 
|-id=229 bgcolor=#fefefe
| 224229 ||  || — || September 26, 2005 || Palomar || NEAT || V || align=right data-sort-value="0.93" | 930 m || 
|-id=230 bgcolor=#E9E9E9
| 224230 ||  || — || September 27, 2005 || Kitt Peak || Spacewatch || — || align=right | 1.4 km || 
|-id=231 bgcolor=#fefefe
| 224231 ||  || — || September 23, 2005 || Catalina || CSS || — || align=right data-sort-value="0.94" | 940 m || 
|-id=232 bgcolor=#E9E9E9
| 224232 ||  || — || September 24, 2005 || Kitt Peak || Spacewatch || — || align=right | 1.2 km || 
|-id=233 bgcolor=#fefefe
| 224233 ||  || — || September 24, 2005 || Kitt Peak || Spacewatch || — || align=right data-sort-value="0.94" | 940 m || 
|-id=234 bgcolor=#fefefe
| 224234 ||  || — || September 24, 2005 || Kitt Peak || Spacewatch || NYS || align=right data-sort-value="0.86" | 860 m || 
|-id=235 bgcolor=#E9E9E9
| 224235 ||  || — || September 24, 2005 || Kitt Peak || Spacewatch || — || align=right | 1.2 km || 
|-id=236 bgcolor=#fefefe
| 224236 ||  || — || September 25, 2005 || Kitt Peak || Spacewatch || NYS || align=right data-sort-value="0.79" | 790 m || 
|-id=237 bgcolor=#E9E9E9
| 224237 ||  || — || September 25, 2005 || Kitt Peak || Spacewatch || — || align=right | 3.2 km || 
|-id=238 bgcolor=#E9E9E9
| 224238 ||  || — || September 25, 2005 || Palomar || NEAT || JUN || align=right | 1.3 km || 
|-id=239 bgcolor=#E9E9E9
| 224239 ||  || — || September 26, 2005 || Kitt Peak || Spacewatch || RAF || align=right | 1.5 km || 
|-id=240 bgcolor=#fefefe
| 224240 ||  || — || September 26, 2005 || Kitt Peak || Spacewatch || NYS || align=right data-sort-value="0.90" | 900 m || 
|-id=241 bgcolor=#E9E9E9
| 224241 ||  || — || September 28, 2005 || Palomar || NEAT || — || align=right | 1.8 km || 
|-id=242 bgcolor=#fefefe
| 224242 ||  || — || September 29, 2005 || Kitt Peak || Spacewatch || NYS || align=right data-sort-value="0.98" | 980 m || 
|-id=243 bgcolor=#fefefe
| 224243 ||  || — || September 29, 2005 || Mount Lemmon || Mount Lemmon Survey || — || align=right | 1.1 km || 
|-id=244 bgcolor=#fefefe
| 224244 ||  || — || September 29, 2005 || Mount Lemmon || Mount Lemmon Survey || NYS || align=right data-sort-value="0.99" | 990 m || 
|-id=245 bgcolor=#E9E9E9
| 224245 ||  || — || September 29, 2005 || Mount Lemmon || Mount Lemmon Survey || — || align=right | 1.2 km || 
|-id=246 bgcolor=#fefefe
| 224246 ||  || — || September 26, 2005 || Socorro || LINEAR || V || align=right | 1.2 km || 
|-id=247 bgcolor=#fefefe
| 224247 ||  || — || September 28, 2005 || Palomar || NEAT || — || align=right | 1.2 km || 
|-id=248 bgcolor=#fefefe
| 224248 ||  || — || September 29, 2005 || Anderson Mesa || LONEOS || ERI || align=right | 2.5 km || 
|-id=249 bgcolor=#E9E9E9
| 224249 ||  || — || September 29, 2005 || Kitt Peak || Spacewatch || — || align=right | 1.1 km || 
|-id=250 bgcolor=#E9E9E9
| 224250 ||  || — || September 29, 2005 || Mount Lemmon || Mount Lemmon Survey || — || align=right | 1.6 km || 
|-id=251 bgcolor=#fefefe
| 224251 ||  || — || September 29, 2005 || Mount Lemmon || Mount Lemmon Survey || MAS || align=right data-sort-value="0.89" | 890 m || 
|-id=252 bgcolor=#E9E9E9
| 224252 ||  || — || September 29, 2005 || Catalina || CSS || — || align=right | 3.2 km || 
|-id=253 bgcolor=#E9E9E9
| 224253 ||  || — || September 29, 2005 || Siding Spring || SSS || — || align=right | 2.1 km || 
|-id=254 bgcolor=#fefefe
| 224254 ||  || — || September 30, 2005 || Mount Lemmon || Mount Lemmon Survey || — || align=right data-sort-value="0.94" | 940 m || 
|-id=255 bgcolor=#E9E9E9
| 224255 ||  || — || September 30, 2005 || Anderson Mesa || LONEOS || — || align=right | 1.3 km || 
|-id=256 bgcolor=#E9E9E9
| 224256 ||  || — || September 30, 2005 || Palomar || NEAT || — || align=right | 1.5 km || 
|-id=257 bgcolor=#E9E9E9
| 224257 ||  || — || September 29, 2005 || Mount Lemmon || Mount Lemmon Survey || — || align=right | 1.0 km || 
|-id=258 bgcolor=#E9E9E9
| 224258 ||  || — || September 29, 2005 || Mount Lemmon || Mount Lemmon Survey || — || align=right | 2.7 km || 
|-id=259 bgcolor=#fefefe
| 224259 ||  || — || September 30, 2005 || Mount Lemmon || Mount Lemmon Survey || — || align=right | 1.4 km || 
|-id=260 bgcolor=#fefefe
| 224260 ||  || — || September 30, 2005 || Kitt Peak || Spacewatch || — || align=right | 1.2 km || 
|-id=261 bgcolor=#E9E9E9
| 224261 ||  || — || September 30, 2005 || Kitt Peak || Spacewatch || — || align=right | 1.4 km || 
|-id=262 bgcolor=#fefefe
| 224262 ||  || — || September 23, 2005 || Catalina || CSS || V || align=right | 1.1 km || 
|-id=263 bgcolor=#fefefe
| 224263 ||  || — || September 22, 2005 || Palomar || NEAT || — || align=right | 1.1 km || 
|-id=264 bgcolor=#fefefe
| 224264 ||  || — || September 22, 2005 || Palomar || NEAT || V || align=right data-sort-value="0.93" | 930 m || 
|-id=265 bgcolor=#fefefe
| 224265 ||  || — || September 22, 2005 || Palomar || NEAT || — || align=right | 1.4 km || 
|-id=266 bgcolor=#fefefe
| 224266 ||  || — || September 29, 2005 || Anderson Mesa || LONEOS || — || align=right | 1.2 km || 
|-id=267 bgcolor=#fefefe
| 224267 ||  || — || September 23, 2005 || Kitt Peak || Spacewatch || — || align=right | 1.2 km || 
|-id=268 bgcolor=#E9E9E9
| 224268 ||  || — || September 23, 2005 || Kitt Peak || Spacewatch || — || align=right | 1.2 km || 
|-id=269 bgcolor=#fefefe
| 224269 || 2005 TV || — || October 1, 2005 || Catalina || CSS || — || align=right | 1.3 km || 
|-id=270 bgcolor=#fefefe
| 224270 ||  || — || October 1, 2005 || Mount Lemmon || Mount Lemmon Survey || — || align=right | 1.1 km || 
|-id=271 bgcolor=#fefefe
| 224271 ||  || — || October 1, 2005 || Mount Lemmon || Mount Lemmon Survey || — || align=right | 1.1 km || 
|-id=272 bgcolor=#fefefe
| 224272 ||  || — || October 5, 2005 || Kitt Peak || Spacewatch || — || align=right | 1.1 km || 
|-id=273 bgcolor=#E9E9E9
| 224273 ||  || — || October 5, 2005 || Socorro || LINEAR || — || align=right | 1.2 km || 
|-id=274 bgcolor=#E9E9E9
| 224274 ||  || — || October 11, 2005 || Bergisch Gladbach || W. Bickel || MAR || align=right | 1.3 km || 
|-id=275 bgcolor=#E9E9E9
| 224275 ||  || — || October 12, 2005 || Bergisch Gladbach || W. Bickel || — || align=right | 2.5 km || 
|-id=276 bgcolor=#fefefe
| 224276 ||  || — || October 3, 2005 || Socorro || LINEAR || FLO || align=right | 1.2 km || 
|-id=277 bgcolor=#E9E9E9
| 224277 ||  || — || October 14, 2005 || Junk Bond || D. Healy || — || align=right | 1.4 km || 
|-id=278 bgcolor=#E9E9E9
| 224278 ||  || — || October 8, 2005 || Moletai || K. Černis, J. Zdanavičius || — || align=right | 1.2 km || 
|-id=279 bgcolor=#E9E9E9
| 224279 ||  || — || October 1, 2005 || Mount Lemmon || Mount Lemmon Survey || — || align=right | 2.1 km || 
|-id=280 bgcolor=#fefefe
| 224280 ||  || — || October 1, 2005 || Mount Lemmon || Mount Lemmon Survey || — || align=right data-sort-value="0.98" | 980 m || 
|-id=281 bgcolor=#E9E9E9
| 224281 ||  || — || October 4, 2005 || Mount Lemmon || Mount Lemmon Survey || — || align=right | 1.3 km || 
|-id=282 bgcolor=#fefefe
| 224282 ||  || — || October 6, 2005 || Mount Lemmon || Mount Lemmon Survey || — || align=right data-sort-value="0.95" | 950 m || 
|-id=283 bgcolor=#fefefe
| 224283 ||  || — || October 3, 2005 || Catalina || CSS || — || align=right | 1.4 km || 
|-id=284 bgcolor=#E9E9E9
| 224284 ||  || — || October 6, 2005 || Anderson Mesa || LONEOS || — || align=right | 4.3 km || 
|-id=285 bgcolor=#E9E9E9
| 224285 ||  || — || October 3, 2005 || Socorro || LINEAR || — || align=right | 2.9 km || 
|-id=286 bgcolor=#fefefe
| 224286 ||  || — || October 6, 2005 || Anderson Mesa || LONEOS || V || align=right | 1.00 km || 
|-id=287 bgcolor=#fefefe
| 224287 ||  || — || October 6, 2005 || Kitt Peak || Spacewatch || NYS || align=right data-sort-value="0.88" | 880 m || 
|-id=288 bgcolor=#E9E9E9
| 224288 ||  || — || October 7, 2005 || Kitt Peak || Spacewatch || — || align=right | 1.1 km || 
|-id=289 bgcolor=#fefefe
| 224289 ||  || — || October 7, 2005 || Catalina || CSS || MAS || align=right | 1.1 km || 
|-id=290 bgcolor=#E9E9E9
| 224290 ||  || — || October 5, 2005 || Kitt Peak || Spacewatch || — || align=right | 1.7 km || 
|-id=291 bgcolor=#fefefe
| 224291 ||  || — || October 7, 2005 || Kitt Peak || Spacewatch || V || align=right | 1.0 km || 
|-id=292 bgcolor=#E9E9E9
| 224292 ||  || — || October 7, 2005 || Kitt Peak || Spacewatch || — || align=right data-sort-value="0.81" | 810 m || 
|-id=293 bgcolor=#E9E9E9
| 224293 ||  || — || October 7, 2005 || Kitt Peak || Spacewatch || — || align=right | 1.0 km || 
|-id=294 bgcolor=#E9E9E9
| 224294 ||  || — || October 7, 2005 || Kitt Peak || Spacewatch || — || align=right | 1.5 km || 
|-id=295 bgcolor=#fefefe
| 224295 ||  || — || October 7, 2005 || Kitt Peak || Spacewatch || MAS || align=right data-sort-value="0.98" | 980 m || 
|-id=296 bgcolor=#E9E9E9
| 224296 ||  || — || October 8, 2005 || Kitt Peak || Spacewatch || — || align=right | 1.8 km || 
|-id=297 bgcolor=#fefefe
| 224297 ||  || — || October 11, 2005 || Nogales || Tenagra II Obs. || — || align=right | 1.0 km || 
|-id=298 bgcolor=#E9E9E9
| 224298 ||  || — || October 9, 2005 || Kitt Peak || Spacewatch || — || align=right | 1.4 km || 
|-id=299 bgcolor=#E9E9E9
| 224299 ||  || — || October 8, 2005 || Socorro || LINEAR || — || align=right data-sort-value="0.99" | 990 m || 
|-id=300 bgcolor=#fefefe
| 224300 ||  || — || October 5, 2005 || Catalina || CSS || — || align=right | 1.3 km || 
|}

224301–224400 

|-bgcolor=#fefefe
| 224301 ||  || — || October 1, 2005 || Mount Lemmon || Mount Lemmon Survey || — || align=right | 1.1 km || 
|-id=302 bgcolor=#E9E9E9
| 224302 ||  || — || October 10, 2005 || Anderson Mesa || LONEOS || ADE || align=right | 2.8 km || 
|-id=303 bgcolor=#E9E9E9
| 224303 ||  || — || October 1, 2005 || Mount Lemmon || Mount Lemmon Survey || — || align=right | 1.6 km || 
|-id=304 bgcolor=#E9E9E9
| 224304 ||  || — || October 10, 2005 || Catalina || CSS || EUN || align=right | 1.2 km || 
|-id=305 bgcolor=#E9E9E9
| 224305 ||  || — || October 27, 2005 || Modra || Š. Gajdoš, J. Világi || ADE || align=right | 2.7 km || 
|-id=306 bgcolor=#fefefe
| 224306 ||  || — || October 20, 2005 || Palomar || NEAT || — || align=right | 1.7 km || 
|-id=307 bgcolor=#E9E9E9
| 224307 ||  || — || October 22, 2005 || Kitt Peak || Spacewatch || — || align=right | 2.1 km || 
|-id=308 bgcolor=#E9E9E9
| 224308 ||  || — || October 22, 2005 || Kitt Peak || Spacewatch || — || align=right | 1.9 km || 
|-id=309 bgcolor=#E9E9E9
| 224309 ||  || — || October 22, 2005 || Kitt Peak || Spacewatch || — || align=right | 1.6 km || 
|-id=310 bgcolor=#E9E9E9
| 224310 ||  || — || October 22, 2005 || Kitt Peak || Spacewatch || — || align=right | 2.9 km || 
|-id=311 bgcolor=#E9E9E9
| 224311 ||  || — || October 23, 2005 || Kitt Peak || Spacewatch || — || align=right data-sort-value="0.86" | 860 m || 
|-id=312 bgcolor=#E9E9E9
| 224312 ||  || — || October 23, 2005 || Kitt Peak || Spacewatch || — || align=right data-sort-value="0.99" | 990 m || 
|-id=313 bgcolor=#E9E9E9
| 224313 ||  || — || October 23, 2005 || Kitt Peak || Spacewatch || — || align=right | 2.0 km || 
|-id=314 bgcolor=#E9E9E9
| 224314 ||  || — || October 23, 2005 || Kitt Peak || Spacewatch || ADE || align=right | 2.3 km || 
|-id=315 bgcolor=#E9E9E9
| 224315 ||  || — || October 23, 2005 || Kitt Peak || Spacewatch || — || align=right | 2.0 km || 
|-id=316 bgcolor=#E9E9E9
| 224316 ||  || — || October 23, 2005 || Catalina || CSS || JUN || align=right | 1.7 km || 
|-id=317 bgcolor=#E9E9E9
| 224317 ||  || — || October 23, 2005 || Catalina || CSS || — || align=right | 1.7 km || 
|-id=318 bgcolor=#E9E9E9
| 224318 ||  || — || October 24, 2005 || Kitt Peak || Spacewatch || — || align=right | 2.7 km || 
|-id=319 bgcolor=#E9E9E9
| 224319 ||  || — || October 24, 2005 || Kitt Peak || Spacewatch || — || align=right | 1.6 km || 
|-id=320 bgcolor=#E9E9E9
| 224320 ||  || — || October 24, 2005 || Kitt Peak || Spacewatch || — || align=right | 2.0 km || 
|-id=321 bgcolor=#E9E9E9
| 224321 ||  || — || October 24, 2005 || Kitt Peak || Spacewatch || NEM || align=right | 2.7 km || 
|-id=322 bgcolor=#E9E9E9
| 224322 ||  || — || October 24, 2005 || Kitt Peak || Spacewatch || — || align=right | 3.3 km || 
|-id=323 bgcolor=#E9E9E9
| 224323 ||  || — || October 22, 2005 || Kitt Peak || Spacewatch || HNS || align=right | 1.5 km || 
|-id=324 bgcolor=#E9E9E9
| 224324 ||  || — || October 22, 2005 || Kitt Peak || Spacewatch || HEN || align=right | 1.0 km || 
|-id=325 bgcolor=#E9E9E9
| 224325 ||  || — || October 22, 2005 || Kitt Peak || Spacewatch || — || align=right | 1.7 km || 
|-id=326 bgcolor=#E9E9E9
| 224326 ||  || — || October 22, 2005 || Kitt Peak || Spacewatch || — || align=right | 2.9 km || 
|-id=327 bgcolor=#E9E9E9
| 224327 ||  || — || October 23, 2005 || Catalina || CSS || — || align=right | 1.2 km || 
|-id=328 bgcolor=#E9E9E9
| 224328 ||  || — || October 23, 2005 || Catalina || CSS || — || align=right | 2.2 km || 
|-id=329 bgcolor=#E9E9E9
| 224329 ||  || — || October 23, 2005 || Catalina || CSS || — || align=right | 1.1 km || 
|-id=330 bgcolor=#E9E9E9
| 224330 ||  || — || October 23, 2005 || Catalina || CSS || ADE || align=right | 3.2 km || 
|-id=331 bgcolor=#E9E9E9
| 224331 ||  || — || October 24, 2005 || Kitt Peak || Spacewatch || — || align=right | 1.7 km || 
|-id=332 bgcolor=#E9E9E9
| 224332 ||  || — || October 25, 2005 || Anderson Mesa || LONEOS || MAR || align=right | 2.0 km || 
|-id=333 bgcolor=#fefefe
| 224333 ||  || — || October 25, 2005 || Anderson Mesa || LONEOS || FLO || align=right | 1.3 km || 
|-id=334 bgcolor=#E9E9E9
| 224334 ||  || — || October 25, 2005 || Mount Lemmon || Mount Lemmon Survey || — || align=right | 2.0 km || 
|-id=335 bgcolor=#E9E9E9
| 224335 ||  || — || October 25, 2005 || Mount Lemmon || Mount Lemmon Survey || — || align=right | 1.6 km || 
|-id=336 bgcolor=#E9E9E9
| 224336 ||  || — || October 25, 2005 || Mount Lemmon || Mount Lemmon Survey || — || align=right | 1.3 km || 
|-id=337 bgcolor=#fefefe
| 224337 ||  || — || October 22, 2005 || Palomar || NEAT || NYS || align=right data-sort-value="0.97" | 970 m || 
|-id=338 bgcolor=#E9E9E9
| 224338 ||  || — || October 22, 2005 || Palomar || NEAT || — || align=right | 1.2 km || 
|-id=339 bgcolor=#E9E9E9
| 224339 ||  || — || October 23, 2005 || Palomar || NEAT || — || align=right | 2.4 km || 
|-id=340 bgcolor=#E9E9E9
| 224340 ||  || — || October 23, 2005 || Palomar || NEAT || — || align=right | 2.9 km || 
|-id=341 bgcolor=#E9E9E9
| 224341 ||  || — || October 24, 2005 || Palomar || NEAT || EUN || align=right | 1.8 km || 
|-id=342 bgcolor=#E9E9E9
| 224342 ||  || — || October 24, 2005 || Palomar || NEAT || — || align=right | 2.0 km || 
|-id=343 bgcolor=#E9E9E9
| 224343 ||  || — || October 25, 2005 || Mount Lemmon || Mount Lemmon Survey || EUN || align=right | 1.6 km || 
|-id=344 bgcolor=#E9E9E9
| 224344 ||  || — || October 22, 2005 || Kitt Peak || Spacewatch || — || align=right | 2.6 km || 
|-id=345 bgcolor=#E9E9E9
| 224345 ||  || — || October 22, 2005 || Kitt Peak || Spacewatch || — || align=right | 2.4 km || 
|-id=346 bgcolor=#E9E9E9
| 224346 ||  || — || October 22, 2005 || Kitt Peak || Spacewatch || RAF || align=right | 1.4 km || 
|-id=347 bgcolor=#E9E9E9
| 224347 ||  || — || October 22, 2005 || Kitt Peak || Spacewatch || — || align=right | 1.1 km || 
|-id=348 bgcolor=#E9E9E9
| 224348 ||  || — || October 22, 2005 || Kitt Peak || Spacewatch || — || align=right | 2.5 km || 
|-id=349 bgcolor=#E9E9E9
| 224349 ||  || — || October 22, 2005 || Kitt Peak || Spacewatch || HEN || align=right | 1.4 km || 
|-id=350 bgcolor=#E9E9E9
| 224350 ||  || — || October 22, 2005 || Kitt Peak || Spacewatch || MIS || align=right | 3.4 km || 
|-id=351 bgcolor=#E9E9E9
| 224351 ||  || — || October 22, 2005 || Kitt Peak || Spacewatch || RAF || align=right | 1.4 km || 
|-id=352 bgcolor=#E9E9E9
| 224352 ||  || — || October 22, 2005 || Kitt Peak || Spacewatch || — || align=right data-sort-value="0.99" | 990 m || 
|-id=353 bgcolor=#E9E9E9
| 224353 ||  || — || October 22, 2005 || Kitt Peak || Spacewatch || — || align=right | 2.0 km || 
|-id=354 bgcolor=#E9E9E9
| 224354 ||  || — || October 22, 2005 || Kitt Peak || Spacewatch || — || align=right | 2.2 km || 
|-id=355 bgcolor=#E9E9E9
| 224355 ||  || — || October 22, 2005 || Kitt Peak || Spacewatch || — || align=right | 2.0 km || 
|-id=356 bgcolor=#E9E9E9
| 224356 ||  || — || October 22, 2005 || Kitt Peak || Spacewatch || — || align=right | 3.4 km || 
|-id=357 bgcolor=#E9E9E9
| 224357 ||  || — || October 22, 2005 || Kitt Peak || Spacewatch || — || align=right | 1.6 km || 
|-id=358 bgcolor=#E9E9E9
| 224358 ||  || — || October 23, 2005 || Catalina || CSS || — || align=right | 1.2 km || 
|-id=359 bgcolor=#E9E9E9
| 224359 ||  || — || October 24, 2005 || Kitt Peak || Spacewatch || MIS || align=right | 3.1 km || 
|-id=360 bgcolor=#E9E9E9
| 224360 ||  || — || October 24, 2005 || Kitt Peak || Spacewatch || — || align=right | 1.5 km || 
|-id=361 bgcolor=#fefefe
| 224361 ||  || — || October 24, 2005 || Kitt Peak || Spacewatch || NYS || align=right | 1.2 km || 
|-id=362 bgcolor=#E9E9E9
| 224362 ||  || — || October 24, 2005 || Kitt Peak || Spacewatch || — || align=right | 1.2 km || 
|-id=363 bgcolor=#fefefe
| 224363 ||  || — || October 25, 2005 || Mount Lemmon || Mount Lemmon Survey || — || align=right data-sort-value="0.80" | 800 m || 
|-id=364 bgcolor=#E9E9E9
| 224364 ||  || — || October 25, 2005 || Mount Lemmon || Mount Lemmon Survey || — || align=right | 1.0 km || 
|-id=365 bgcolor=#E9E9E9
| 224365 ||  || — || October 25, 2005 || Catalina || CSS || — || align=right | 2.8 km || 
|-id=366 bgcolor=#E9E9E9
| 224366 ||  || — || October 26, 2005 || Kitt Peak || Spacewatch || MIS || align=right | 3.2 km || 
|-id=367 bgcolor=#E9E9E9
| 224367 ||  || — || October 26, 2005 || Kitt Peak || Spacewatch || — || align=right | 1.9 km || 
|-id=368 bgcolor=#E9E9E9
| 224368 ||  || — || October 26, 2005 || Kitt Peak || Spacewatch || — || align=right | 1.7 km || 
|-id=369 bgcolor=#fefefe
| 224369 ||  || — || October 26, 2005 || Kitt Peak || Spacewatch || — || align=right | 1.3 km || 
|-id=370 bgcolor=#fefefe
| 224370 ||  || — || October 22, 2005 || Catalina || CSS || V || align=right | 1.1 km || 
|-id=371 bgcolor=#E9E9E9
| 224371 ||  || — || October 24, 2005 || Kitt Peak || Spacewatch || — || align=right | 1.5 km || 
|-id=372 bgcolor=#fefefe
| 224372 ||  || — || October 24, 2005 || Kitt Peak || Spacewatch || MAS || align=right data-sort-value="0.86" | 860 m || 
|-id=373 bgcolor=#E9E9E9
| 224373 ||  || — || October 24, 2005 || Kitt Peak || Spacewatch || — || align=right | 1.6 km || 
|-id=374 bgcolor=#E9E9E9
| 224374 ||  || — || October 24, 2005 || Kitt Peak || Spacewatch || — || align=right | 2.6 km || 
|-id=375 bgcolor=#E9E9E9
| 224375 ||  || — || October 24, 2005 || Kitt Peak || Spacewatch || — || align=right | 2.7 km || 
|-id=376 bgcolor=#E9E9E9
| 224376 ||  || — || October 24, 2005 || Kitt Peak || Spacewatch || — || align=right | 1.9 km || 
|-id=377 bgcolor=#E9E9E9
| 224377 ||  || — || October 24, 2005 || Kitt Peak || Spacewatch || — || align=right | 2.7 km || 
|-id=378 bgcolor=#E9E9E9
| 224378 ||  || — || October 24, 2005 || Kitt Peak || Spacewatch || HEN || align=right | 1.2 km || 
|-id=379 bgcolor=#E9E9E9
| 224379 ||  || — || October 26, 2005 || Anderson Mesa || LONEOS || — || align=right | 2.1 km || 
|-id=380 bgcolor=#E9E9E9
| 224380 ||  || — || October 26, 2005 || Kitt Peak || Spacewatch || — || align=right data-sort-value="0.95" | 950 m || 
|-id=381 bgcolor=#E9E9E9
| 224381 ||  || — || October 22, 2005 || Kitt Peak || Spacewatch || — || align=right | 1.1 km || 
|-id=382 bgcolor=#E9E9E9
| 224382 ||  || — || October 22, 2005 || Kitt Peak || Spacewatch || — || align=right | 1.3 km || 
|-id=383 bgcolor=#E9E9E9
| 224383 ||  || — || October 22, 2005 || Kitt Peak || Spacewatch || — || align=right | 2.2 km || 
|-id=384 bgcolor=#d6d6d6
| 224384 ||  || — || October 24, 2005 || Kitt Peak || Spacewatch || — || align=right | 4.2 km || 
|-id=385 bgcolor=#E9E9E9
| 224385 ||  || — || October 25, 2005 || Kitt Peak || Spacewatch || HEN || align=right | 1.3 km || 
|-id=386 bgcolor=#E9E9E9
| 224386 ||  || — || October 25, 2005 || Kitt Peak || Spacewatch || — || align=right | 2.7 km || 
|-id=387 bgcolor=#E9E9E9
| 224387 ||  || — || October 25, 2005 || Kitt Peak || Spacewatch || — || align=right | 1.8 km || 
|-id=388 bgcolor=#E9E9E9
| 224388 ||  || — || October 25, 2005 || Kitt Peak || Spacewatch || — || align=right | 3.2 km || 
|-id=389 bgcolor=#E9E9E9
| 224389 ||  || — || October 25, 2005 || Mount Lemmon || Mount Lemmon Survey || — || align=right | 1.8 km || 
|-id=390 bgcolor=#E9E9E9
| 224390 ||  || — || October 26, 2005 || Kitt Peak || Spacewatch || WIT || align=right | 1.8 km || 
|-id=391 bgcolor=#E9E9E9
| 224391 ||  || — || October 26, 2005 || Kitt Peak || Spacewatch || — || align=right | 1.4 km || 
|-id=392 bgcolor=#E9E9E9
| 224392 ||  || — || October 27, 2005 || Kitt Peak || Spacewatch || — || align=right | 1.3 km || 
|-id=393 bgcolor=#E9E9E9
| 224393 ||  || — || October 25, 2005 || Mount Lemmon || Mount Lemmon Survey || — || align=right | 1.2 km || 
|-id=394 bgcolor=#E9E9E9
| 224394 ||  || — || October 25, 2005 || Kitt Peak || Spacewatch || — || align=right | 1.8 km || 
|-id=395 bgcolor=#E9E9E9
| 224395 ||  || — || October 25, 2005 || Kitt Peak || Spacewatch || — || align=right | 1.9 km || 
|-id=396 bgcolor=#E9E9E9
| 224396 ||  || — || October 27, 2005 || Mount Lemmon || Mount Lemmon Survey || — || align=right | 1.3 km || 
|-id=397 bgcolor=#E9E9E9
| 224397 ||  || — || October 25, 2005 || Kitt Peak || Spacewatch || HEN || align=right | 1.4 km || 
|-id=398 bgcolor=#E9E9E9
| 224398 ||  || — || October 25, 2005 || Kitt Peak || Spacewatch || — || align=right | 2.7 km || 
|-id=399 bgcolor=#E9E9E9
| 224399 ||  || — || October 27, 2005 || Kitt Peak || Spacewatch || — || align=right | 1.6 km || 
|-id=400 bgcolor=#E9E9E9
| 224400 ||  || — || October 24, 2005 || Kitt Peak || Spacewatch || HEN || align=right | 1.4 km || 
|}

224401–224500 

|-bgcolor=#E9E9E9
| 224401 ||  || — || October 24, 2005 || Kitt Peak || Spacewatch || — || align=right data-sort-value="0.85" | 850 m || 
|-id=402 bgcolor=#E9E9E9
| 224402 ||  || — || October 26, 2005 || Kitt Peak || Spacewatch || — || align=right | 2.1 km || 
|-id=403 bgcolor=#E9E9E9
| 224403 ||  || — || October 26, 2005 || Kitt Peak || Spacewatch || — || align=right | 1.7 km || 
|-id=404 bgcolor=#E9E9E9
| 224404 ||  || — || October 29, 2005 || Mount Lemmon || Mount Lemmon Survey || — || align=right data-sort-value="0.96" | 960 m || 
|-id=405 bgcolor=#E9E9E9
| 224405 ||  || — || October 29, 2005 || Catalina || CSS || — || align=right | 2.0 km || 
|-id=406 bgcolor=#E9E9E9
| 224406 ||  || — || October 28, 2005 || Catalina || CSS || — || align=right | 2.1 km || 
|-id=407 bgcolor=#E9E9E9
| 224407 ||  || — || October 25, 2005 || Catalina || CSS || — || align=right | 1.3 km || 
|-id=408 bgcolor=#E9E9E9
| 224408 ||  || — || October 28, 2005 || Catalina || CSS || — || align=right | 1.5 km || 
|-id=409 bgcolor=#E9E9E9
| 224409 ||  || — || October 28, 2005 || Mount Lemmon || Mount Lemmon Survey || — || align=right | 2.3 km || 
|-id=410 bgcolor=#E9E9E9
| 224410 ||  || — || October 29, 2005 || Catalina || CSS || — || align=right | 2.6 km || 
|-id=411 bgcolor=#E9E9E9
| 224411 ||  || — || October 29, 2005 || Mount Lemmon || Mount Lemmon Survey || — || align=right | 1.7 km || 
|-id=412 bgcolor=#E9E9E9
| 224412 ||  || — || October 29, 2005 || Mount Lemmon || Mount Lemmon Survey || HEN || align=right | 1.3 km || 
|-id=413 bgcolor=#E9E9E9
| 224413 ||  || — || October 29, 2005 || Mount Lemmon || Mount Lemmon Survey || — || align=right | 2.4 km || 
|-id=414 bgcolor=#d6d6d6
| 224414 ||  || — || October 31, 2005 || Kitt Peak || Spacewatch || — || align=right | 3.4 km || 
|-id=415 bgcolor=#E9E9E9
| 224415 ||  || — || October 25, 2005 || Catalina || CSS || HNS || align=right | 1.9 km || 
|-id=416 bgcolor=#E9E9E9
| 224416 ||  || — || October 29, 2005 || Mount Lemmon || Mount Lemmon Survey || — || align=right | 2.8 km || 
|-id=417 bgcolor=#fefefe
| 224417 ||  || — || October 24, 2005 || Kitt Peak || Spacewatch || — || align=right | 1.1 km || 
|-id=418 bgcolor=#E9E9E9
| 224418 ||  || — || October 25, 2005 || Mount Lemmon || Mount Lemmon Survey || — || align=right | 1.4 km || 
|-id=419 bgcolor=#E9E9E9
| 224419 ||  || — || October 28, 2005 || Mount Lemmon || Mount Lemmon Survey || — || align=right | 1.2 km || 
|-id=420 bgcolor=#E9E9E9
| 224420 ||  || — || October 30, 2005 || Kitt Peak || Spacewatch || GEF || align=right | 1.4 km || 
|-id=421 bgcolor=#E9E9E9
| 224421 ||  || — || October 27, 2005 || Catalina || CSS || — || align=right | 2.8 km || 
|-id=422 bgcolor=#E9E9E9
| 224422 ||  || — || October 30, 2005 || Palomar || NEAT || AER || align=right | 2.1 km || 
|-id=423 bgcolor=#E9E9E9
| 224423 ||  || — || October 28, 2005 || Kitt Peak || Spacewatch || WIT || align=right | 1.4 km || 
|-id=424 bgcolor=#E9E9E9
| 224424 ||  || — || October 29, 2005 || Kitt Peak || Spacewatch || — || align=right | 2.1 km || 
|-id=425 bgcolor=#E9E9E9
| 224425 ||  || — || October 31, 2005 || Mount Lemmon || Mount Lemmon Survey || — || align=right | 2.2 km || 
|-id=426 bgcolor=#E9E9E9
| 224426 ||  || — || October 25, 2005 || Kitt Peak || Spacewatch || — || align=right | 1.5 km || 
|-id=427 bgcolor=#E9E9E9
| 224427 ||  || — || October 25, 2005 || Kitt Peak || Spacewatch || — || align=right | 1.6 km || 
|-id=428 bgcolor=#E9E9E9
| 224428 ||  || — || October 25, 2005 || Kitt Peak || Spacewatch || — || align=right | 1.9 km || 
|-id=429 bgcolor=#E9E9E9
| 224429 ||  || — || October 28, 2005 || Kitt Peak || Spacewatch || — || align=right | 1.3 km || 
|-id=430 bgcolor=#E9E9E9
| 224430 ||  || — || October 30, 2005 || Socorro || LINEAR || — || align=right | 4.5 km || 
|-id=431 bgcolor=#E9E9E9
| 224431 ||  || — || October 31, 2005 || Mount Lemmon || Mount Lemmon Survey || — || align=right | 2.2 km || 
|-id=432 bgcolor=#E9E9E9
| 224432 ||  || — || October 30, 2005 || Palomar || NEAT || MAR || align=right | 1.5 km || 
|-id=433 bgcolor=#d6d6d6
| 224433 ||  || — || October 29, 2005 || Kitt Peak || Spacewatch || ALA || align=right | 5.1 km || 
|-id=434 bgcolor=#E9E9E9
| 224434 ||  || — || October 30, 2005 || Kitt Peak || Spacewatch || — || align=right | 4.0 km || 
|-id=435 bgcolor=#E9E9E9
| 224435 ||  || — || October 30, 2005 || Kitt Peak || Spacewatch || HEN || align=right | 1.6 km || 
|-id=436 bgcolor=#E9E9E9
| 224436 ||  || — || October 30, 2005 || Kitt Peak || Spacewatch || — || align=right | 2.2 km || 
|-id=437 bgcolor=#E9E9E9
| 224437 ||  || — || October 30, 2005 || Mount Lemmon || Mount Lemmon Survey || — || align=right | 1.8 km || 
|-id=438 bgcolor=#E9E9E9
| 224438 ||  || — || October 26, 2005 || Kitt Peak || Spacewatch || KON || align=right | 3.1 km || 
|-id=439 bgcolor=#E9E9E9
| 224439 ||  || — || October 27, 2005 || Anderson Mesa || LONEOS || — || align=right | 2.1 km || 
|-id=440 bgcolor=#E9E9E9
| 224440 ||  || — || October 22, 2005 || Palomar || NEAT || — || align=right data-sort-value="0.99" | 990 m || 
|-id=441 bgcolor=#E9E9E9
| 224441 ||  || — || October 22, 2005 || Palomar || NEAT || — || align=right | 2.2 km || 
|-id=442 bgcolor=#E9E9E9
| 224442 ||  || — || October 23, 2005 || Catalina || CSS || — || align=right | 2.9 km || 
|-id=443 bgcolor=#E9E9E9
| 224443 ||  || — || October 25, 2005 || Catalina || CSS || — || align=right | 2.3 km || 
|-id=444 bgcolor=#E9E9E9
| 224444 ||  || — || October 25, 2005 || Catalina || CSS || — || align=right | 1.5 km || 
|-id=445 bgcolor=#E9E9E9
| 224445 ||  || — || October 27, 2005 || Anderson Mesa || LONEOS || — || align=right | 2.4 km || 
|-id=446 bgcolor=#E9E9E9
| 224446 ||  || — || October 25, 2005 || Mount Lemmon || Mount Lemmon Survey || — || align=right | 1.9 km || 
|-id=447 bgcolor=#E9E9E9
| 224447 ||  || — || October 22, 2005 || Kitt Peak || Spacewatch || AGN || align=right | 1.4 km || 
|-id=448 bgcolor=#E9E9E9
| 224448 ||  || — || October 25, 2005 || Mount Lemmon || Mount Lemmon Survey || — || align=right | 2.6 km || 
|-id=449 bgcolor=#E9E9E9
| 224449 ||  || — || November 8, 2005 || Socorro || LINEAR || WIT || align=right | 1.6 km || 
|-id=450 bgcolor=#E9E9E9
| 224450 ||  || — || November 2, 2005 || Socorro || LINEAR || — || align=right | 1.3 km || 
|-id=451 bgcolor=#E9E9E9
| 224451 ||  || — || November 1, 2005 || Catalina || CSS || ADE || align=right | 3.2 km || 
|-id=452 bgcolor=#E9E9E9
| 224452 ||  || — || November 3, 2005 || Catalina || CSS || EUN || align=right | 1.9 km || 
|-id=453 bgcolor=#E9E9E9
| 224453 ||  || — || November 1, 2005 || Socorro || LINEAR || EUN || align=right | 2.0 km || 
|-id=454 bgcolor=#E9E9E9
| 224454 ||  || — || November 2, 2005 || Socorro || LINEAR || — || align=right | 1.7 km || 
|-id=455 bgcolor=#E9E9E9
| 224455 ||  || — || November 3, 2005 || Mount Lemmon || Mount Lemmon Survey || EUN || align=right | 1.8 km || 
|-id=456 bgcolor=#d6d6d6
| 224456 ||  || — || November 3, 2005 || Kitt Peak || Spacewatch || EOS || align=right | 4.5 km || 
|-id=457 bgcolor=#E9E9E9
| 224457 ||  || — || November 4, 2005 || Kitt Peak || Spacewatch || PAD || align=right | 2.3 km || 
|-id=458 bgcolor=#E9E9E9
| 224458 ||  || — || November 3, 2005 || Socorro || LINEAR || — || align=right | 2.5 km || 
|-id=459 bgcolor=#E9E9E9
| 224459 ||  || — || November 3, 2005 || Socorro || LINEAR || — || align=right | 1.7 km || 
|-id=460 bgcolor=#E9E9E9
| 224460 ||  || — || November 3, 2005 || Mount Lemmon || Mount Lemmon Survey || — || align=right | 1.7 km || 
|-id=461 bgcolor=#E9E9E9
| 224461 ||  || — || November 4, 2005 || Catalina || CSS || — || align=right | 2.5 km || 
|-id=462 bgcolor=#E9E9E9
| 224462 ||  || — || November 1, 2005 || Catalina || CSS || — || align=right | 1.5 km || 
|-id=463 bgcolor=#E9E9E9
| 224463 ||  || — || November 2, 2005 || Catalina || CSS || MIT || align=right | 3.9 km || 
|-id=464 bgcolor=#E9E9E9
| 224464 ||  || — || November 1, 2005 || Socorro || LINEAR || — || align=right | 1.8 km || 
|-id=465 bgcolor=#fefefe
| 224465 ||  || — || November 3, 2005 || Mount Lemmon || Mount Lemmon Survey || V || align=right data-sort-value="0.86" | 860 m || 
|-id=466 bgcolor=#E9E9E9
| 224466 ||  || — || November 3, 2005 || Catalina || CSS || — || align=right | 1.2 km || 
|-id=467 bgcolor=#E9E9E9
| 224467 ||  || — || November 4, 2005 || Kitt Peak || Spacewatch || — || align=right | 1.7 km || 
|-id=468 bgcolor=#E9E9E9
| 224468 ||  || — || November 4, 2005 || Kitt Peak || Spacewatch || — || align=right | 1.9 km || 
|-id=469 bgcolor=#E9E9E9
| 224469 ||  || — || November 4, 2005 || Catalina || CSS || — || align=right | 1.4 km || 
|-id=470 bgcolor=#E9E9E9
| 224470 ||  || — || November 4, 2005 || Catalina || CSS || — || align=right | 1.4 km || 
|-id=471 bgcolor=#E9E9E9
| 224471 ||  || — || November 1, 2005 || Mount Lemmon || Mount Lemmon Survey || BRG || align=right | 2.0 km || 
|-id=472 bgcolor=#E9E9E9
| 224472 ||  || — || November 1, 2005 || Mount Lemmon || Mount Lemmon Survey || — || align=right | 4.0 km || 
|-id=473 bgcolor=#E9E9E9
| 224473 ||  || — || November 1, 2005 || Mount Lemmon || Mount Lemmon Survey || EUN || align=right | 2.4 km || 
|-id=474 bgcolor=#E9E9E9
| 224474 ||  || — || November 1, 2005 || Mount Lemmon || Mount Lemmon Survey || — || align=right | 3.3 km || 
|-id=475 bgcolor=#E9E9E9
| 224475 ||  || — || November 1, 2005 || Mount Lemmon || Mount Lemmon Survey || — || align=right | 2.1 km || 
|-id=476 bgcolor=#E9E9E9
| 224476 ||  || — || November 1, 2005 || Mount Lemmon || Mount Lemmon Survey || — || align=right | 1.9 km || 
|-id=477 bgcolor=#E9E9E9
| 224477 ||  || — || November 1, 2005 || Mount Lemmon || Mount Lemmon Survey || NEM || align=right | 3.5 km || 
|-id=478 bgcolor=#E9E9E9
| 224478 ||  || — || November 1, 2005 || Socorro || LINEAR || IAN || align=right | 1.7 km || 
|-id=479 bgcolor=#E9E9E9
| 224479 ||  || — || November 3, 2005 || Mount Lemmon || Mount Lemmon Survey || — || align=right | 2.1 km || 
|-id=480 bgcolor=#E9E9E9
| 224480 ||  || — || November 4, 2005 || Mount Lemmon || Mount Lemmon Survey || — || align=right | 2.2 km || 
|-id=481 bgcolor=#d6d6d6
| 224481 ||  || — || November 5, 2005 || Kitt Peak || Spacewatch || — || align=right | 4.7 km || 
|-id=482 bgcolor=#E9E9E9
| 224482 ||  || — || November 6, 2005 || Socorro || LINEAR || — || align=right | 1.4 km || 
|-id=483 bgcolor=#E9E9E9
| 224483 ||  || — || November 10, 2005 || Catalina || CSS || EUN || align=right | 2.1 km || 
|-id=484 bgcolor=#E9E9E9
| 224484 ||  || — || November 1, 2005 || Kitt Peak || Spacewatch || — || align=right | 1.4 km || 
|-id=485 bgcolor=#E9E9E9
| 224485 ||  || — || November 5, 2005 || Kitt Peak || Spacewatch || — || align=right | 2.8 km || 
|-id=486 bgcolor=#E9E9E9
| 224486 ||  || — || November 11, 2005 || Kitt Peak || Spacewatch || — || align=right | 1.6 km || 
|-id=487 bgcolor=#E9E9E9
| 224487 ||  || — || November 1, 2005 || Mount Lemmon || Mount Lemmon Survey || — || align=right | 1.5 km || 
|-id=488 bgcolor=#E9E9E9
| 224488 ||  || — || November 21, 2005 || Socorro || LINEAR || — || align=right | 3.3 km || 
|-id=489 bgcolor=#E9E9E9
| 224489 ||  || — || November 19, 2005 || Palomar || NEAT || MAR || align=right | 1.5 km || 
|-id=490 bgcolor=#E9E9E9
| 224490 ||  || — || November 20, 2005 || Palomar || NEAT || — || align=right | 2.8 km || 
|-id=491 bgcolor=#E9E9E9
| 224491 ||  || — || November 21, 2005 || Catalina || CSS || — || align=right | 2.2 km || 
|-id=492 bgcolor=#E9E9E9
| 224492 ||  || — || November 21, 2005 || Junk Bond || D. Healy || — || align=right | 4.6 km || 
|-id=493 bgcolor=#E9E9E9
| 224493 ||  || — || November 21, 2005 || Palomar || NEAT || — || align=right | 2.0 km || 
|-id=494 bgcolor=#E9E9E9
| 224494 ||  || — || November 21, 2005 || Kitt Peak || Spacewatch || — || align=right | 1.7 km || 
|-id=495 bgcolor=#E9E9E9
| 224495 ||  || — || November 22, 2005 || Kitt Peak || Spacewatch || — || align=right | 2.4 km || 
|-id=496 bgcolor=#E9E9E9
| 224496 ||  || — || November 22, 2005 || Kitt Peak || Spacewatch || — || align=right | 1.6 km || 
|-id=497 bgcolor=#E9E9E9
| 224497 ||  || — || November 21, 2005 || Kitt Peak || Spacewatch || — || align=right | 2.6 km || 
|-id=498 bgcolor=#E9E9E9
| 224498 ||  || — || November 21, 2005 || Kitt Peak || Spacewatch || — || align=right | 1.9 km || 
|-id=499 bgcolor=#E9E9E9
| 224499 ||  || — || November 21, 2005 || Kitt Peak || Spacewatch || MRX || align=right | 1.5 km || 
|-id=500 bgcolor=#E9E9E9
| 224500 ||  || — || November 21, 2005 || Kitt Peak || Spacewatch || — || align=right | 1.9 km || 
|}

224501–224600 

|-bgcolor=#E9E9E9
| 224501 ||  || — || November 21, 2005 || Kitt Peak || Spacewatch || — || align=right | 2.7 km || 
|-id=502 bgcolor=#E9E9E9
| 224502 ||  || — || November 21, 2005 || Kitt Peak || Spacewatch || — || align=right | 1.2 km || 
|-id=503 bgcolor=#E9E9E9
| 224503 ||  || — || November 21, 2005 || Kitt Peak || Spacewatch || — || align=right | 2.3 km || 
|-id=504 bgcolor=#E9E9E9
| 224504 ||  || — || November 21, 2005 || Kitt Peak || Spacewatch || — || align=right data-sort-value="0.89" | 890 m || 
|-id=505 bgcolor=#E9E9E9
| 224505 ||  || — || November 21, 2005 || Kitt Peak || Spacewatch || — || align=right | 2.4 km || 
|-id=506 bgcolor=#E9E9E9
| 224506 ||  || — || November 21, 2005 || Kitt Peak || Spacewatch || — || align=right | 2.4 km || 
|-id=507 bgcolor=#E9E9E9
| 224507 ||  || — || November 22, 2005 || Kitt Peak || Spacewatch || — || align=right | 2.6 km || 
|-id=508 bgcolor=#E9E9E9
| 224508 ||  || — || November 22, 2005 || Kitt Peak || Spacewatch || — || align=right | 2.3 km || 
|-id=509 bgcolor=#E9E9E9
| 224509 ||  || — || November 22, 2005 || Kitt Peak || Spacewatch || HOF || align=right | 3.8 km || 
|-id=510 bgcolor=#d6d6d6
| 224510 ||  || — || November 21, 2005 || Kitt Peak || Spacewatch || — || align=right | 3.4 km || 
|-id=511 bgcolor=#E9E9E9
| 224511 ||  || — || November 21, 2005 || Kitt Peak || Spacewatch || — || align=right | 1.7 km || 
|-id=512 bgcolor=#E9E9E9
| 224512 ||  || — || November 25, 2005 || Kitt Peak || Spacewatch || — || align=right | 1.9 km || 
|-id=513 bgcolor=#E9E9E9
| 224513 ||  || — || November 25, 2005 || Kitt Peak || Spacewatch || — || align=right | 1.3 km || 
|-id=514 bgcolor=#E9E9E9
| 224514 ||  || — || November 22, 2005 || Kitt Peak || Spacewatch || — || align=right | 1.9 km || 
|-id=515 bgcolor=#E9E9E9
| 224515 ||  || — || November 26, 2005 || Mount Lemmon || Mount Lemmon Survey || — || align=right | 1.3 km || 
|-id=516 bgcolor=#E9E9E9
| 224516 ||  || — || November 21, 2005 || Catalina || CSS || — || align=right | 2.1 km || 
|-id=517 bgcolor=#E9E9E9
| 224517 ||  || — || November 21, 2005 || Kitt Peak || Spacewatch || — || align=right | 2.1 km || 
|-id=518 bgcolor=#E9E9E9
| 224518 ||  || — || November 21, 2005 || Palomar || NEAT || — || align=right | 2.3 km || 
|-id=519 bgcolor=#E9E9E9
| 224519 ||  || — || November 25, 2005 || Palomar || NEAT || — || align=right | 1.5 km || 
|-id=520 bgcolor=#E9E9E9
| 224520 ||  || — || November 25, 2005 || Kitt Peak || Spacewatch || AER || align=right | 2.1 km || 
|-id=521 bgcolor=#E9E9E9
| 224521 ||  || — || November 25, 2005 || Kitt Peak || Spacewatch || — || align=right | 3.0 km || 
|-id=522 bgcolor=#E9E9E9
| 224522 ||  || — || November 28, 2005 || Palomar || NEAT || — || align=right | 2.2 km || 
|-id=523 bgcolor=#E9E9E9
| 224523 ||  || — || November 25, 2005 || Kitt Peak || Spacewatch || MIS || align=right | 2.5 km || 
|-id=524 bgcolor=#E9E9E9
| 224524 ||  || — || November 26, 2005 || Mount Lemmon || Mount Lemmon Survey || — || align=right | 1.2 km || 
|-id=525 bgcolor=#E9E9E9
| 224525 ||  || — || November 26, 2005 || Mount Lemmon || Mount Lemmon Survey || — || align=right | 2.0 km || 
|-id=526 bgcolor=#E9E9E9
| 224526 ||  || — || November 25, 2005 || Mount Lemmon || Mount Lemmon Survey || — || align=right | 1.1 km || 
|-id=527 bgcolor=#E9E9E9
| 224527 ||  || — || November 26, 2005 || Mount Lemmon || Mount Lemmon Survey || — || align=right | 2.3 km || 
|-id=528 bgcolor=#E9E9E9
| 224528 ||  || — || November 28, 2005 || Catalina || CSS || — || align=right | 1.9 km || 
|-id=529 bgcolor=#E9E9E9
| 224529 ||  || — || November 28, 2005 || Mount Lemmon || Mount Lemmon Survey || — || align=right | 2.1 km || 
|-id=530 bgcolor=#E9E9E9
| 224530 ||  || — || November 29, 2005 || Mount Lemmon || Mount Lemmon Survey || — || align=right | 2.4 km || 
|-id=531 bgcolor=#E9E9E9
| 224531 ||  || — || November 29, 2005 || Catalina || CSS || — || align=right | 3.0 km || 
|-id=532 bgcolor=#E9E9E9
| 224532 ||  || — || November 29, 2005 || Catalina || CSS || JUN || align=right | 1.3 km || 
|-id=533 bgcolor=#E9E9E9
| 224533 ||  || — || November 29, 2005 || Catalina || CSS || — || align=right | 3.0 km || 
|-id=534 bgcolor=#E9E9E9
| 224534 ||  || — || November 30, 2005 || Kitt Peak || Spacewatch || — || align=right | 2.0 km || 
|-id=535 bgcolor=#E9E9E9
| 224535 ||  || — || November 28, 2005 || Socorro || LINEAR || — || align=right | 2.2 km || 
|-id=536 bgcolor=#E9E9E9
| 224536 ||  || — || November 30, 2005 || Socorro || LINEAR || — || align=right | 2.5 km || 
|-id=537 bgcolor=#E9E9E9
| 224537 ||  || — || November 28, 2005 || Socorro || LINEAR || ADE || align=right | 2.0 km || 
|-id=538 bgcolor=#E9E9E9
| 224538 ||  || — || November 29, 2005 || Kitt Peak || Spacewatch || — || align=right | 1.5 km || 
|-id=539 bgcolor=#E9E9E9
| 224539 ||  || — || November 29, 2005 || Socorro || LINEAR || — || align=right | 3.8 km || 
|-id=540 bgcolor=#E9E9E9
| 224540 ||  || — || November 30, 2005 || Socorro || LINEAR || MIS || align=right | 4.0 km || 
|-id=541 bgcolor=#E9E9E9
| 224541 ||  || — || November 25, 2005 || Mount Lemmon || Mount Lemmon Survey || — || align=right | 1.3 km || 
|-id=542 bgcolor=#E9E9E9
| 224542 ||  || — || November 25, 2005 || Mount Lemmon || Mount Lemmon Survey || — || align=right | 2.9 km || 
|-id=543 bgcolor=#E9E9E9
| 224543 ||  || — || November 25, 2005 || Mount Lemmon || Mount Lemmon Survey || — || align=right | 3.6 km || 
|-id=544 bgcolor=#E9E9E9
| 224544 ||  || — || November 25, 2005 || Mount Lemmon || Mount Lemmon Survey || — || align=right | 3.4 km || 
|-id=545 bgcolor=#d6d6d6
| 224545 ||  || — || November 25, 2005 || Mount Lemmon || Mount Lemmon Survey || — || align=right | 5.3 km || 
|-id=546 bgcolor=#E9E9E9
| 224546 ||  || — || November 28, 2005 || Mount Lemmon || Mount Lemmon Survey || — || align=right | 2.0 km || 
|-id=547 bgcolor=#d6d6d6
| 224547 ||  || — || November 25, 2005 || Mount Lemmon || Mount Lemmon Survey || — || align=right | 5.0 km || 
|-id=548 bgcolor=#E9E9E9
| 224548 ||  || — || November 25, 2005 || Mount Lemmon || Mount Lemmon Survey || CLO || align=right | 2.6 km || 
|-id=549 bgcolor=#E9E9E9
| 224549 ||  || — || November 27, 2005 || Anderson Mesa || LONEOS || EUN || align=right | 1.5 km || 
|-id=550 bgcolor=#E9E9E9
| 224550 ||  || — || November 28, 2005 || Kitt Peak || Spacewatch || HOF || align=right | 3.8 km || 
|-id=551 bgcolor=#E9E9E9
| 224551 ||  || — || November 28, 2005 || Kitt Peak || Spacewatch || — || align=right | 1.7 km || 
|-id=552 bgcolor=#E9E9E9
| 224552 ||  || — || November 28, 2005 || Socorro || LINEAR || — || align=right | 2.5 km || 
|-id=553 bgcolor=#E9E9E9
| 224553 ||  || — || November 28, 2005 || Kitt Peak || Spacewatch || — || align=right | 1.3 km || 
|-id=554 bgcolor=#E9E9E9
| 224554 ||  || — || November 28, 2005 || Catalina || CSS || — || align=right | 4.1 km || 
|-id=555 bgcolor=#E9E9E9
| 224555 ||  || — || November 29, 2005 || Palomar || NEAT || — || align=right | 3.3 km || 
|-id=556 bgcolor=#E9E9E9
| 224556 ||  || — || November 30, 2005 || Socorro || LINEAR || HEN || align=right | 1.5 km || 
|-id=557 bgcolor=#E9E9E9
| 224557 ||  || — || November 26, 2005 || Catalina || CSS || — || align=right | 3.2 km || 
|-id=558 bgcolor=#E9E9E9
| 224558 ||  || — || November 30, 2005 || Kitt Peak || Spacewatch || DOR || align=right | 3.5 km || 
|-id=559 bgcolor=#E9E9E9
| 224559 ||  || — || November 21, 2005 || Palomar || NEAT || EMI || align=right | 1.8 km || 
|-id=560 bgcolor=#E9E9E9
| 224560 ||  || — || November 21, 2005 || Anderson Mesa || LONEOS || — || align=right | 1.7 km || 
|-id=561 bgcolor=#E9E9E9
| 224561 ||  || — || November 25, 2005 || Catalina || CSS || — || align=right | 2.1 km || 
|-id=562 bgcolor=#E9E9E9
| 224562 ||  || — || November 29, 2005 || Kitt Peak || Spacewatch || — || align=right | 2.4 km || 
|-id=563 bgcolor=#E9E9E9
| 224563 ||  || — || November 30, 2005 || Socorro || LINEAR || — || align=right | 3.2 km || 
|-id=564 bgcolor=#E9E9E9
| 224564 ||  || — || November 20, 2005 || Palomar || NEAT || — || align=right | 2.1 km || 
|-id=565 bgcolor=#E9E9E9
| 224565 ||  || — || November 22, 2005 || Catalina || CSS || — || align=right | 2.8 km || 
|-id=566 bgcolor=#E9E9E9
| 224566 ||  || — || November 25, 2005 || Catalina || CSS || — || align=right | 2.2 km || 
|-id=567 bgcolor=#d6d6d6
| 224567 ||  || — || November 25, 2005 || Mount Lemmon || Mount Lemmon Survey || — || align=right | 5.2 km || 
|-id=568 bgcolor=#d6d6d6
| 224568 ||  || — || November 28, 2005 || Mount Lemmon || Mount Lemmon Survey || — || align=right | 2.9 km || 
|-id=569 bgcolor=#E9E9E9
| 224569 ||  || — || December 1, 2005 || Socorro || LINEAR || — || align=right | 2.0 km || 
|-id=570 bgcolor=#E9E9E9
| 224570 ||  || — || December 1, 2005 || Kitt Peak || Spacewatch || AGN || align=right | 1.5 km || 
|-id=571 bgcolor=#E9E9E9
| 224571 ||  || — || December 1, 2005 || Palomar || NEAT || — || align=right | 3.4 km || 
|-id=572 bgcolor=#E9E9E9
| 224572 ||  || — || December 2, 2005 || Socorro || LINEAR || — || align=right | 1.2 km || 
|-id=573 bgcolor=#E9E9E9
| 224573 ||  || — || December 1, 2005 || Kitt Peak || Spacewatch || — || align=right | 2.6 km || 
|-id=574 bgcolor=#E9E9E9
| 224574 ||  || — || December 1, 2005 || Kitt Peak || Spacewatch || — || align=right | 2.4 km || 
|-id=575 bgcolor=#E9E9E9
| 224575 ||  || — || December 2, 2005 || Socorro || LINEAR || — || align=right | 1.7 km || 
|-id=576 bgcolor=#E9E9E9
| 224576 ||  || — || December 4, 2005 || Socorro || LINEAR || — || align=right | 2.2 km || 
|-id=577 bgcolor=#E9E9E9
| 224577 ||  || — || December 4, 2005 || Socorro || LINEAR || ADE || align=right | 3.4 km || 
|-id=578 bgcolor=#E9E9E9
| 224578 ||  || — || December 1, 2005 || Catalina || CSS || — || align=right | 1.5 km || 
|-id=579 bgcolor=#E9E9E9
| 224579 ||  || — || December 1, 2005 || Catalina || CSS || — || align=right | 1.6 km || 
|-id=580 bgcolor=#E9E9E9
| 224580 ||  || — || December 7, 2005 || Socorro || LINEAR || — || align=right | 1.5 km || 
|-id=581 bgcolor=#d6d6d6
| 224581 ||  || — || December 4, 2005 || Kitt Peak || Spacewatch || — || align=right | 2.2 km || 
|-id=582 bgcolor=#E9E9E9
| 224582 ||  || — || December 2, 2005 || Kitt Peak || Spacewatch || WIT || align=right | 1.4 km || 
|-id=583 bgcolor=#E9E9E9
| 224583 ||  || — || December 3, 2005 || Kitt Peak || Spacewatch || HEN || align=right | 1.4 km || 
|-id=584 bgcolor=#E9E9E9
| 224584 ||  || — || December 4, 2005 || Socorro || LINEAR || — || align=right | 2.1 km || 
|-id=585 bgcolor=#E9E9E9
| 224585 ||  || — || December 5, 2005 || Mount Lemmon || Mount Lemmon Survey || AGN || align=right | 1.9 km || 
|-id=586 bgcolor=#E9E9E9
| 224586 ||  || — || December 6, 2005 || Catalina || CSS || — || align=right | 2.7 km || 
|-id=587 bgcolor=#E9E9E9
| 224587 ||  || — || December 4, 2005 || Mount Lemmon || Mount Lemmon Survey || — || align=right | 3.1 km || 
|-id=588 bgcolor=#E9E9E9
| 224588 ||  || — || December 7, 2005 || Socorro || LINEAR || KON || align=right | 3.9 km || 
|-id=589 bgcolor=#E9E9E9
| 224589 ||  || — || December 6, 2005 || Kitt Peak || Spacewatch || — || align=right | 3.6 km || 
|-id=590 bgcolor=#E9E9E9
| 224590 ||  || — || December 6, 2005 || Kitt Peak || Spacewatch || MRX || align=right | 1.2 km || 
|-id=591 bgcolor=#d6d6d6
| 224591 ||  || — || December 1, 2005 || Kitt Peak || M. W. Buie || — || align=right | 3.0 km || 
|-id=592 bgcolor=#d6d6d6
| 224592 Carnac ||  ||  || December 22, 2005 || Nogales || J.-C. Merlin || KOR || align=right | 1.7 km || 
|-id=593 bgcolor=#E9E9E9
| 224593 ||  || — || December 22, 2005 || Kitt Peak || Spacewatch || XIZ || align=right | 1.8 km || 
|-id=594 bgcolor=#E9E9E9
| 224594 ||  || — || December 22, 2005 || Kitt Peak || Spacewatch || — || align=right | 3.0 km || 
|-id=595 bgcolor=#d6d6d6
| 224595 ||  || — || December 22, 2005 || Kitt Peak || Spacewatch || THM || align=right | 3.0 km || 
|-id=596 bgcolor=#d6d6d6
| 224596 ||  || — || December 22, 2005 || Kitt Peak || Spacewatch || — || align=right | 3.5 km || 
|-id=597 bgcolor=#d6d6d6
| 224597 ||  || — || December 22, 2005 || Kitt Peak || Spacewatch || — || align=right | 3.6 km || 
|-id=598 bgcolor=#d6d6d6
| 224598 ||  || — || December 24, 2005 || Kitt Peak || Spacewatch || KOR || align=right | 2.4 km || 
|-id=599 bgcolor=#d6d6d6
| 224599 ||  || — || December 24, 2005 || Kitt Peak || Spacewatch || — || align=right | 3.1 km || 
|-id=600 bgcolor=#d6d6d6
| 224600 ||  || — || December 22, 2005 || Kitt Peak || Spacewatch || KOR || align=right | 1.8 km || 
|}

224601–224700 

|-bgcolor=#d6d6d6
| 224601 ||  || — || December 22, 2005 || Kitt Peak || Spacewatch || — || align=right | 4.0 km || 
|-id=602 bgcolor=#d6d6d6
| 224602 ||  || — || December 22, 2005 || Kitt Peak || Spacewatch || — || align=right | 3.9 km || 
|-id=603 bgcolor=#d6d6d6
| 224603 ||  || — || December 24, 2005 || Kitt Peak || Spacewatch || KAR || align=right | 1.4 km || 
|-id=604 bgcolor=#d6d6d6
| 224604 ||  || — || December 25, 2005 || Kitt Peak || Spacewatch || HYG || align=right | 4.2 km || 
|-id=605 bgcolor=#d6d6d6
| 224605 ||  || — || December 25, 2005 || Kitt Peak || Spacewatch || KAR || align=right | 1.2 km || 
|-id=606 bgcolor=#E9E9E9
| 224606 ||  || — || December 25, 2005 || Mount Lemmon || Mount Lemmon Survey || PAD || align=right | 3.9 km || 
|-id=607 bgcolor=#d6d6d6
| 224607 ||  || — || December 22, 2005 || Kitt Peak || Spacewatch || — || align=right | 3.3 km || 
|-id=608 bgcolor=#d6d6d6
| 224608 ||  || — || December 24, 2005 || Kitt Peak || Spacewatch || — || align=right | 3.0 km || 
|-id=609 bgcolor=#E9E9E9
| 224609 ||  || — || December 22, 2005 || Catalina || CSS || — || align=right | 2.5 km || 
|-id=610 bgcolor=#d6d6d6
| 224610 ||  || — || December 24, 2005 || Kitt Peak || Spacewatch || — || align=right | 3.9 km || 
|-id=611 bgcolor=#d6d6d6
| 224611 ||  || — || December 24, 2005 || Kitt Peak || Spacewatch || KAR || align=right | 1.3 km || 
|-id=612 bgcolor=#E9E9E9
| 224612 ||  || — || December 26, 2005 || Kitt Peak || Spacewatch || — || align=right | 3.2 km || 
|-id=613 bgcolor=#d6d6d6
| 224613 ||  || — || December 26, 2005 || Kitt Peak || Spacewatch || KOR || align=right | 1.6 km || 
|-id=614 bgcolor=#d6d6d6
| 224614 ||  || — || December 26, 2005 || Kitt Peak || Spacewatch || — || align=right | 2.9 km || 
|-id=615 bgcolor=#E9E9E9
| 224615 ||  || — || December 26, 2005 || Kitt Peak || Spacewatch || HEN || align=right | 1.4 km || 
|-id=616 bgcolor=#d6d6d6
| 224616 ||  || — || December 26, 2005 || Kitt Peak || Spacewatch || KOR || align=right | 1.9 km || 
|-id=617 bgcolor=#d6d6d6
| 224617 Micromégas ||  ||  || December 22, 2005 || Nogales || J.-C. Merlin || — || align=right | 2.7 km || 
|-id=618 bgcolor=#d6d6d6
| 224618 ||  || — || December 24, 2005 || Kitt Peak || Spacewatch || KOR || align=right | 1.7 km || 
|-id=619 bgcolor=#d6d6d6
| 224619 ||  || — || December 25, 2005 || Mount Lemmon || Mount Lemmon Survey || THM || align=right | 2.9 km || 
|-id=620 bgcolor=#E9E9E9
| 224620 ||  || — || December 25, 2005 || Kitt Peak || Spacewatch || AGN || align=right | 1.4 km || 
|-id=621 bgcolor=#E9E9E9
| 224621 ||  || — || December 25, 2005 || Kitt Peak || Spacewatch || MIS || align=right | 2.7 km || 
|-id=622 bgcolor=#E9E9E9
| 224622 ||  || — || December 28, 2005 || Socorro || LINEAR || — || align=right | 2.6 km || 
|-id=623 bgcolor=#E9E9E9
| 224623 ||  || — || December 25, 2005 || Kitt Peak || Spacewatch || AST || align=right | 2.9 km || 
|-id=624 bgcolor=#d6d6d6
| 224624 ||  || — || December 25, 2005 || Kitt Peak || Spacewatch || — || align=right | 3.5 km || 
|-id=625 bgcolor=#d6d6d6
| 224625 ||  || — || December 25, 2005 || Kitt Peak || Spacewatch || KOR || align=right | 1.7 km || 
|-id=626 bgcolor=#E9E9E9
| 224626 ||  || — || December 25, 2005 || Kitt Peak || Spacewatch || AGN || align=right | 1.7 km || 
|-id=627 bgcolor=#E9E9E9
| 224627 ||  || — || December 24, 2005 || Socorro || LINEAR || — || align=right | 2.1 km || 
|-id=628 bgcolor=#d6d6d6
| 224628 ||  || — || December 28, 2005 || Mount Lemmon || Mount Lemmon Survey || — || align=right | 2.2 km || 
|-id=629 bgcolor=#d6d6d6
| 224629 ||  || — || December 28, 2005 || Mount Lemmon || Mount Lemmon Survey || — || align=right | 3.6 km || 
|-id=630 bgcolor=#d6d6d6
| 224630 ||  || — || December 27, 2005 || Mount Lemmon || Mount Lemmon Survey || KOR || align=right | 2.0 km || 
|-id=631 bgcolor=#E9E9E9
| 224631 ||  || — || December 24, 2005 || Socorro || LINEAR || — || align=right | 3.0 km || 
|-id=632 bgcolor=#d6d6d6
| 224632 ||  || — || December 26, 2005 || Mount Lemmon || Mount Lemmon Survey || — || align=right | 4.3 km || 
|-id=633 bgcolor=#E9E9E9
| 224633 ||  || — || December 27, 2005 || Mount Lemmon || Mount Lemmon Survey || AEO || align=right | 2.0 km || 
|-id=634 bgcolor=#d6d6d6
| 224634 ||  || — || December 27, 2005 || Mount Lemmon || Mount Lemmon Survey || KOR || align=right | 1.9 km || 
|-id=635 bgcolor=#d6d6d6
| 224635 ||  || — || December 29, 2005 || Mount Lemmon || Mount Lemmon Survey || — || align=right | 4.2 km || 
|-id=636 bgcolor=#d6d6d6
| 224636 ||  || — || December 26, 2005 || Mount Lemmon || Mount Lemmon Survey || — || align=right | 3.1 km || 
|-id=637 bgcolor=#E9E9E9
| 224637 ||  || — || December 27, 2005 || Kitt Peak || Spacewatch || HOF || align=right | 3.1 km || 
|-id=638 bgcolor=#E9E9E9
| 224638 ||  || — || December 24, 2005 || Socorro || LINEAR || — || align=right | 2.5 km || 
|-id=639 bgcolor=#E9E9E9
| 224639 ||  || — || December 27, 2005 || Socorro || LINEAR || ADE || align=right | 2.0 km || 
|-id=640 bgcolor=#d6d6d6
| 224640 ||  || — || December 27, 2005 || Catalina || CSS || 615 || align=right | 2.6 km || 
|-id=641 bgcolor=#d6d6d6
| 224641 ||  || — || December 22, 2005 || Kitt Peak || Spacewatch || KOR || align=right | 2.2 km || 
|-id=642 bgcolor=#d6d6d6
| 224642 ||  || — || December 30, 2005 || Kitt Peak || Spacewatch || — || align=right | 3.8 km || 
|-id=643 bgcolor=#d6d6d6
| 224643 ||  || — || December 30, 2005 || Kitt Peak || Spacewatch || — || align=right | 3.9 km || 
|-id=644 bgcolor=#d6d6d6
| 224644 ||  || — || December 24, 2005 || Kitt Peak || Spacewatch || KOR || align=right | 1.6 km || 
|-id=645 bgcolor=#d6d6d6
| 224645 ||  || — || December 24, 2005 || Kitt Peak || Spacewatch || — || align=right | 4.6 km || 
|-id=646 bgcolor=#d6d6d6
| 224646 ||  || — || December 21, 2005 || Catalina || CSS || — || align=right | 3.4 km || 
|-id=647 bgcolor=#E9E9E9
| 224647 ||  || — || December 24, 2005 || Socorro || LINEAR || — || align=right | 1.8 km || 
|-id=648 bgcolor=#d6d6d6
| 224648 ||  || — || December 31, 2005 || Kitt Peak || Spacewatch || — || align=right | 2.9 km || 
|-id=649 bgcolor=#E9E9E9
| 224649 ||  || — || December 25, 2005 || Kitt Peak || Spacewatch || — || align=right | 1.6 km || 
|-id=650 bgcolor=#d6d6d6
| 224650 ||  || — || December 28, 2005 || Mount Lemmon || Mount Lemmon Survey || — || align=right | 3.1 km || 
|-id=651 bgcolor=#d6d6d6
| 224651 ||  || — || December 28, 2005 || Kitt Peak || Spacewatch || — || align=right | 2.1 km || 
|-id=652 bgcolor=#d6d6d6
| 224652 ||  || — || December 29, 2005 || Kitt Peak || Spacewatch || HYG || align=right | 3.9 km || 
|-id=653 bgcolor=#d6d6d6
| 224653 ||  || — || December 29, 2005 || Socorro || LINEAR || EOS || align=right | 3.4 km || 
|-id=654 bgcolor=#d6d6d6
| 224654 ||  || — || December 30, 2005 || Kitt Peak || Spacewatch || — || align=right | 2.5 km || 
|-id=655 bgcolor=#d6d6d6
| 224655 ||  || — || December 25, 2005 || Mount Lemmon || Mount Lemmon Survey || — || align=right | 3.7 km || 
|-id=656 bgcolor=#E9E9E9
| 224656 ||  || — || December 26, 2005 || Mount Lemmon || Mount Lemmon Survey || — || align=right | 2.4 km || 
|-id=657 bgcolor=#d6d6d6
| 224657 ||  || — || December 27, 2005 || Mount Lemmon || Mount Lemmon Survey || KOR || align=right | 2.1 km || 
|-id=658 bgcolor=#d6d6d6
| 224658 ||  || — || December 25, 2005 || Anderson Mesa || LONEOS || ALA || align=right | 5.6 km || 
|-id=659 bgcolor=#E9E9E9
| 224659 || 2006 AR || — || January 3, 2006 || Desert Moon || B. L. Stevens || — || align=right | 2.3 km || 
|-id=660 bgcolor=#d6d6d6
| 224660 || 2006 AY || — || January 3, 2006 || Marly || Naef Obs. || — || align=right | 3.1 km || 
|-id=661 bgcolor=#d6d6d6
| 224661 ||  || — || January 2, 2006 || Socorro || LINEAR || LIX || align=right | 7.0 km || 
|-id=662 bgcolor=#d6d6d6
| 224662 ||  || — || January 5, 2006 || Catalina || CSS || NAE || align=right | 4.5 km || 
|-id=663 bgcolor=#E9E9E9
| 224663 ||  || — || January 5, 2006 || Anderson Mesa || LONEOS || INO || align=right | 2.1 km || 
|-id=664 bgcolor=#E9E9E9
| 224664 ||  || — || January 5, 2006 || Mount Lemmon || Mount Lemmon Survey || — || align=right | 3.9 km || 
|-id=665 bgcolor=#d6d6d6
| 224665 ||  || — || January 2, 2006 || Catalina || CSS || — || align=right | 6.0 km || 
|-id=666 bgcolor=#d6d6d6
| 224666 ||  || — || January 5, 2006 || Catalina || CSS || — || align=right | 5.5 km || 
|-id=667 bgcolor=#d6d6d6
| 224667 ||  || — || January 5, 2006 || Catalina || CSS || THM || align=right | 3.0 km || 
|-id=668 bgcolor=#d6d6d6
| 224668 ||  || — || January 5, 2006 || Mount Lemmon || Mount Lemmon Survey || KOR || align=right | 2.0 km || 
|-id=669 bgcolor=#d6d6d6
| 224669 ||  || — || January 5, 2006 || Catalina || CSS || — || align=right | 3.0 km || 
|-id=670 bgcolor=#E9E9E9
| 224670 ||  || — || January 6, 2006 || Socorro || LINEAR || CLO || align=right | 3.0 km || 
|-id=671 bgcolor=#d6d6d6
| 224671 ||  || — || January 7, 2006 || Kitt Peak || Spacewatch || — || align=right | 5.1 km || 
|-id=672 bgcolor=#E9E9E9
| 224672 ||  || — || January 5, 2006 || Kitt Peak || Spacewatch || HEN || align=right | 1.6 km || 
|-id=673 bgcolor=#d6d6d6
| 224673 ||  || — || January 5, 2006 || Kitt Peak || Spacewatch || KOR || align=right | 1.7 km || 
|-id=674 bgcolor=#E9E9E9
| 224674 ||  || — || January 6, 2006 || Socorro || LINEAR || HEN || align=right | 1.6 km || 
|-id=675 bgcolor=#E9E9E9
| 224675 ||  || — || January 7, 2006 || Mount Lemmon || Mount Lemmon Survey || — || align=right | 3.3 km || 
|-id=676 bgcolor=#d6d6d6
| 224676 ||  || — || January 8, 2006 || Mount Lemmon || Mount Lemmon Survey || — || align=right | 3.3 km || 
|-id=677 bgcolor=#d6d6d6
| 224677 ||  || — || January 4, 2006 || Mount Lemmon || Mount Lemmon Survey || KOR || align=right | 1.7 km || 
|-id=678 bgcolor=#d6d6d6
| 224678 ||  || — || January 4, 2006 || Mount Lemmon || Mount Lemmon Survey || THM || align=right | 2.7 km || 
|-id=679 bgcolor=#d6d6d6
| 224679 ||  || — || January 9, 2006 || Kitt Peak || Spacewatch || — || align=right | 4.6 km || 
|-id=680 bgcolor=#d6d6d6
| 224680 ||  || — || January 6, 2006 || Kitt Peak || Spacewatch || KOR || align=right | 2.0 km || 
|-id=681 bgcolor=#d6d6d6
| 224681 ||  || — || January 6, 2006 || Mount Lemmon || Mount Lemmon Survey || — || align=right | 4.8 km || 
|-id=682 bgcolor=#d6d6d6
| 224682 ||  || — || January 6, 2006 || Kitt Peak || Spacewatch || — || align=right | 3.5 km || 
|-id=683 bgcolor=#d6d6d6
| 224683 ||  || — || January 6, 2006 || Mount Lemmon || Mount Lemmon Survey || KOR || align=right | 1.8 km || 
|-id=684 bgcolor=#E9E9E9
| 224684 ||  || — || January 5, 2006 || Socorro || LINEAR || — || align=right | 3.8 km || 
|-id=685 bgcolor=#E9E9E9
| 224685 ||  || — || January 7, 2006 || Anderson Mesa || LONEOS || — || align=right | 3.6 km || 
|-id=686 bgcolor=#E9E9E9
| 224686 ||  || — || January 6, 2006 || Mount Lemmon || Mount Lemmon Survey || HEN || align=right | 1.2 km || 
|-id=687 bgcolor=#d6d6d6
| 224687 ||  || — || January 7, 2006 || Mount Lemmon || Mount Lemmon Survey || — || align=right | 2.3 km || 
|-id=688 bgcolor=#d6d6d6
| 224688 ||  || — || January 7, 2006 || Anderson Mesa || LONEOS || LIX || align=right | 5.4 km || 
|-id=689 bgcolor=#d6d6d6
| 224689 ||  || — || January 7, 2006 || Kitt Peak || Spacewatch || THM || align=right | 2.4 km || 
|-id=690 bgcolor=#d6d6d6
| 224690 ||  || — || January 20, 2006 || Kitt Peak || Spacewatch || — || align=right | 3.3 km || 
|-id=691 bgcolor=#d6d6d6
| 224691 ||  || — || January 21, 2006 || Palomar || NEAT || — || align=right | 4.4 km || 
|-id=692 bgcolor=#d6d6d6
| 224692 ||  || — || January 22, 2006 || Mount Lemmon || Mount Lemmon Survey || — || align=right | 3.2 km || 
|-id=693 bgcolor=#d6d6d6
| 224693 Morganfreeman ||  ||  || January 21, 2006 || Vallemare di Borbona || V. S. Casulli || — || align=right | 4.0 km || 
|-id=694 bgcolor=#d6d6d6
| 224694 ||  || — || January 22, 2006 || Anderson Mesa || LONEOS || — || align=right | 4.4 km || 
|-id=695 bgcolor=#d6d6d6
| 224695 ||  || — || January 20, 2006 || Kitt Peak || Spacewatch || — || align=right | 3.5 km || 
|-id=696 bgcolor=#d6d6d6
| 224696 ||  || — || January 20, 2006 || Kitt Peak || Spacewatch || — || align=right | 3.0 km || 
|-id=697 bgcolor=#d6d6d6
| 224697 ||  || — || January 21, 2006 || Kitt Peak || Spacewatch || — || align=right | 3.4 km || 
|-id=698 bgcolor=#d6d6d6
| 224698 ||  || — || January 21, 2006 || Kitt Peak || Spacewatch || EOS || align=right | 3.5 km || 
|-id=699 bgcolor=#d6d6d6
| 224699 ||  || — || January 21, 2006 || Kitt Peak || Spacewatch || EOS || align=right | 2.7 km || 
|-id=700 bgcolor=#d6d6d6
| 224700 ||  || — || January 25, 2006 || Kitt Peak || Spacewatch || — || align=right | 3.3 km || 
|}

224701–224800 

|-bgcolor=#d6d6d6
| 224701 ||  || — || January 23, 2006 || Kitt Peak || Spacewatch || EOS || align=right | 3.0 km || 
|-id=702 bgcolor=#d6d6d6
| 224702 ||  || — || January 23, 2006 || Kitt Peak || Spacewatch || — || align=right | 4.8 km || 
|-id=703 bgcolor=#d6d6d6
| 224703 ||  || — || January 25, 2006 || Kitt Peak || Spacewatch || — || align=right | 3.6 km || 
|-id=704 bgcolor=#d6d6d6
| 224704 ||  || — || January 25, 2006 || Kitt Peak || Spacewatch || — || align=right | 3.7 km || 
|-id=705 bgcolor=#d6d6d6
| 224705 ||  || — || January 25, 2006 || Kitt Peak || Spacewatch || — || align=right | 3.6 km || 
|-id=706 bgcolor=#d6d6d6
| 224706 ||  || — || January 23, 2006 || Mount Lemmon || Mount Lemmon Survey || — || align=right | 3.2 km || 
|-id=707 bgcolor=#d6d6d6
| 224707 ||  || — || January 25, 2006 || Kitt Peak || Spacewatch || — || align=right | 2.9 km || 
|-id=708 bgcolor=#d6d6d6
| 224708 ||  || — || January 26, 2006 || Kitt Peak || Spacewatch || — || align=right | 3.9 km || 
|-id=709 bgcolor=#d6d6d6
| 224709 ||  || — || January 26, 2006 || Kitt Peak || Spacewatch || — || align=right | 3.6 km || 
|-id=710 bgcolor=#d6d6d6
| 224710 ||  || — || January 26, 2006 || Kitt Peak || Spacewatch || — || align=right | 3.3 km || 
|-id=711 bgcolor=#d6d6d6
| 224711 ||  || — || January 27, 2006 || Mount Lemmon || Mount Lemmon Survey || EOS || align=right | 6.1 km || 
|-id=712 bgcolor=#d6d6d6
| 224712 ||  || — || January 28, 2006 || Mount Lemmon || Mount Lemmon Survey || — || align=right | 3.7 km || 
|-id=713 bgcolor=#d6d6d6
| 224713 ||  || — || January 28, 2006 || Mount Lemmon || Mount Lemmon Survey || KOR || align=right | 2.0 km || 
|-id=714 bgcolor=#d6d6d6
| 224714 ||  || — || January 25, 2006 || Kitt Peak || Spacewatch || — || align=right | 4.6 km || 
|-id=715 bgcolor=#d6d6d6
| 224715 ||  || — || January 26, 2006 || Anderson Mesa || LONEOS || — || align=right | 4.2 km || 
|-id=716 bgcolor=#d6d6d6
| 224716 ||  || — || January 26, 2006 || Mount Lemmon || Mount Lemmon Survey || — || align=right | 4.7 km || 
|-id=717 bgcolor=#d6d6d6
| 224717 ||  || — || January 26, 2006 || Mount Lemmon || Mount Lemmon Survey || EOS || align=right | 3.1 km || 
|-id=718 bgcolor=#d6d6d6
| 224718 ||  || — || January 26, 2006 || Mount Lemmon || Mount Lemmon Survey || — || align=right | 3.3 km || 
|-id=719 bgcolor=#d6d6d6
| 224719 ||  || — || January 27, 2006 || Kitt Peak || Spacewatch || KOR || align=right | 1.6 km || 
|-id=720 bgcolor=#E9E9E9
| 224720 ||  || — || January 27, 2006 || Mount Lemmon || Mount Lemmon Survey || AGN || align=right | 1.6 km || 
|-id=721 bgcolor=#d6d6d6
| 224721 ||  || — || January 27, 2006 || Mount Lemmon || Mount Lemmon Survey || — || align=right | 3.2 km || 
|-id=722 bgcolor=#d6d6d6
| 224722 ||  || — || January 27, 2006 || Mount Lemmon || Mount Lemmon Survey || — || align=right | 5.6 km || 
|-id=723 bgcolor=#d6d6d6
| 224723 ||  || — || January 28, 2006 || Mount Lemmon || Mount Lemmon Survey || HYG || align=right | 5.6 km || 
|-id=724 bgcolor=#d6d6d6
| 224724 ||  || — || January 31, 2006 || Kitt Peak || Spacewatch || KOR || align=right | 2.3 km || 
|-id=725 bgcolor=#d6d6d6
| 224725 ||  || — || January 31, 2006 || Mount Lemmon || Mount Lemmon Survey || ANF || align=right | 2.4 km || 
|-id=726 bgcolor=#d6d6d6
| 224726 ||  || — || January 31, 2006 || Catalina || CSS || — || align=right | 5.9 km || 
|-id=727 bgcolor=#d6d6d6
| 224727 ||  || — || January 31, 2006 || Kitt Peak || Spacewatch || — || align=right | 3.9 km || 
|-id=728 bgcolor=#d6d6d6
| 224728 ||  || — || January 31, 2006 || Kitt Peak || Spacewatch || — || align=right | 5.6 km || 
|-id=729 bgcolor=#d6d6d6
| 224729 ||  || — || January 26, 2006 || Catalina || CSS || — || align=right | 5.0 km || 
|-id=730 bgcolor=#d6d6d6
| 224730 ||  || — || January 28, 2006 || Anderson Mesa || LONEOS || HYG || align=right | 5.5 km || 
|-id=731 bgcolor=#d6d6d6
| 224731 ||  || — || February 3, 2006 || 7300 Observatory || W. K. Y. Yeung || — || align=right | 4.8 km || 
|-id=732 bgcolor=#d6d6d6
| 224732 ||  || — || February 1, 2006 || Kitt Peak || Spacewatch || K-2 || align=right | 1.7 km || 
|-id=733 bgcolor=#d6d6d6
| 224733 ||  || — || February 2, 2006 || Kitt Peak || Spacewatch || — || align=right | 4.6 km || 
|-id=734 bgcolor=#d6d6d6
| 224734 ||  || — || February 2, 2006 || Kitt Peak || Spacewatch || — || align=right | 4.2 km || 
|-id=735 bgcolor=#d6d6d6
| 224735 ||  || — || February 20, 2006 || Kitt Peak || Spacewatch || — || align=right | 5.2 km || 
|-id=736 bgcolor=#d6d6d6
| 224736 ||  || — || February 20, 2006 || Kitt Peak || Spacewatch || — || align=right | 3.4 km || 
|-id=737 bgcolor=#d6d6d6
| 224737 ||  || — || February 20, 2006 || Mount Lemmon || Mount Lemmon Survey || — || align=right | 4.7 km || 
|-id=738 bgcolor=#d6d6d6
| 224738 ||  || — || February 20, 2006 || Mount Lemmon || Mount Lemmon Survey || — || align=right | 3.8 km || 
|-id=739 bgcolor=#d6d6d6
| 224739 ||  || — || February 23, 2006 || Kitt Peak || Spacewatch || — || align=right | 5.0 km || 
|-id=740 bgcolor=#d6d6d6
| 224740 ||  || — || February 20, 2006 || Kitt Peak || Spacewatch || — || align=right | 3.5 km || 
|-id=741 bgcolor=#d6d6d6
| 224741 ||  || — || February 20, 2006 || Catalina || CSS || — || align=right | 3.4 km || 
|-id=742 bgcolor=#d6d6d6
| 224742 ||  || — || February 20, 2006 || Kitt Peak || Spacewatch || KOR || align=right | 2.1 km || 
|-id=743 bgcolor=#d6d6d6
| 224743 ||  || — || February 22, 2006 || Anderson Mesa || LONEOS || — || align=right | 4.1 km || 
|-id=744 bgcolor=#d6d6d6
| 224744 ||  || — || February 22, 2006 || Socorro || LINEAR || — || align=right | 5.6 km || 
|-id=745 bgcolor=#d6d6d6
| 224745 ||  || — || February 24, 2006 || Palomar || NEAT || — || align=right | 6.8 km || 
|-id=746 bgcolor=#d6d6d6
| 224746 ||  || — || February 23, 2006 || Anderson Mesa || LONEOS || — || align=right | 5.3 km || 
|-id=747 bgcolor=#d6d6d6
| 224747 ||  || — || February 23, 2006 || Anderson Mesa || LONEOS || — || align=right | 4.8 km || 
|-id=748 bgcolor=#d6d6d6
| 224748 ||  || — || February 22, 2006 || Catalina || CSS || HYG || align=right | 4.2 km || 
|-id=749 bgcolor=#d6d6d6
| 224749 ||  || — || February 24, 2006 || Kitt Peak || Spacewatch || — || align=right | 4.4 km || 
|-id=750 bgcolor=#d6d6d6
| 224750 ||  || — || February 24, 2006 || Kitt Peak || Spacewatch || 7:4 || align=right | 5.7 km || 
|-id=751 bgcolor=#d6d6d6
| 224751 ||  || — || February 24, 2006 || Kitt Peak || Spacewatch || HYG || align=right | 4.2 km || 
|-id=752 bgcolor=#d6d6d6
| 224752 ||  || — || February 27, 2006 || Mount Lemmon || Mount Lemmon Survey || — || align=right | 5.0 km || 
|-id=753 bgcolor=#d6d6d6
| 224753 ||  || — || February 25, 2006 || Kitt Peak || Spacewatch || HYG || align=right | 5.3 km || 
|-id=754 bgcolor=#d6d6d6
| 224754 ||  || — || February 25, 2006 || Kitt Peak || Spacewatch || HYG || align=right | 4.1 km || 
|-id=755 bgcolor=#d6d6d6
| 224755 ||  || — || February 27, 2006 || Kitt Peak || Spacewatch || — || align=right | 4.1 km || 
|-id=756 bgcolor=#d6d6d6
| 224756 ||  || — || February 27, 2006 || Mount Lemmon || Mount Lemmon Survey || — || align=right | 3.8 km || 
|-id=757 bgcolor=#d6d6d6
| 224757 ||  || — || February 27, 2006 || Kitt Peak || Spacewatch || — || align=right | 3.5 km || 
|-id=758 bgcolor=#d6d6d6
| 224758 ||  || — || February 22, 2006 || Catalina || CSS || EOS || align=right | 4.4 km || 
|-id=759 bgcolor=#d6d6d6
| 224759 ||  || — || February 27, 2006 || Catalina || CSS || — || align=right | 6.3 km || 
|-id=760 bgcolor=#d6d6d6
| 224760 ||  || — || February 27, 2006 || Catalina || CSS || — || align=right | 5.3 km || 
|-id=761 bgcolor=#d6d6d6
| 224761 ||  || — || March 2, 2006 || Nyukasa || Mount Nyukasa Stn. || — || align=right | 4.3 km || 
|-id=762 bgcolor=#d6d6d6
| 224762 ||  || — || March 2, 2006 || Kitt Peak || Spacewatch || — || align=right | 5.1 km || 
|-id=763 bgcolor=#d6d6d6
| 224763 ||  || — || March 2, 2006 || Kitt Peak || Spacewatch || — || align=right | 3.9 km || 
|-id=764 bgcolor=#d6d6d6
| 224764 ||  || — || March 2, 2006 || Mount Lemmon || Mount Lemmon Survey || THM || align=right | 3.2 km || 
|-id=765 bgcolor=#d6d6d6
| 224765 ||  || — || March 5, 2006 || Kitt Peak || Spacewatch || — || align=right | 3.7 km || 
|-id=766 bgcolor=#d6d6d6
| 224766 ||  || — || March 5, 2006 || Kitt Peak || Spacewatch || — || align=right | 3.2 km || 
|-id=767 bgcolor=#d6d6d6
| 224767 ||  || — || March 5, 2006 || Kitt Peak || Spacewatch || HYG || align=right | 4.3 km || 
|-id=768 bgcolor=#d6d6d6
| 224768 ||  || — || March 23, 2006 || Mount Lemmon || Mount Lemmon Survey || ALA || align=right | 4.0 km || 
|-id=769 bgcolor=#d6d6d6
| 224769 ||  || — || March 23, 2006 || Kitt Peak || Spacewatch || 7:4 || align=right | 5.6 km || 
|-id=770 bgcolor=#d6d6d6
| 224770 ||  || — || March 23, 2006 || Mount Lemmon || Mount Lemmon Survey || THM || align=right | 2.5 km || 
|-id=771 bgcolor=#d6d6d6
| 224771 ||  || — || March 23, 2006 || Mount Lemmon || Mount Lemmon Survey || SYL7:4 || align=right | 6.4 km || 
|-id=772 bgcolor=#d6d6d6
| 224772 ||  || — || March 24, 2006 || Mount Lemmon || Mount Lemmon Survey || — || align=right | 3.1 km || 
|-id=773 bgcolor=#d6d6d6
| 224773 ||  || — || March 25, 2006 || Catalina || CSS || — || align=right | 5.9 km || 
|-id=774 bgcolor=#d6d6d6
| 224774 ||  || — || March 25, 2006 || Catalina || CSS || — || align=right | 7.5 km || 
|-id=775 bgcolor=#d6d6d6
| 224775 ||  || — || March 27, 2006 || Siding Spring || SSS || TIR || align=right | 5.1 km || 
|-id=776 bgcolor=#d6d6d6
| 224776 ||  || — || April 2, 2006 || Mount Lemmon || Mount Lemmon Survey || — || align=right | 4.1 km || 
|-id=777 bgcolor=#d6d6d6
| 224777 ||  || — || April 6, 2006 || Kitt Peak || Spacewatch || — || align=right | 4.6 km || 
|-id=778 bgcolor=#d6d6d6
| 224778 ||  || — || April 2, 2006 || Anderson Mesa || LONEOS || — || align=right | 5.5 km || 
|-id=779 bgcolor=#d6d6d6
| 224779 ||  || — || April 7, 2006 || Catalina || CSS || TIR || align=right | 4.2 km || 
|-id=780 bgcolor=#d6d6d6
| 224780 ||  || — || April 7, 2006 || Anderson Mesa || LONEOS || — || align=right | 7.1 km || 
|-id=781 bgcolor=#d6d6d6
| 224781 ||  || — || April 19, 2006 || Mount Lemmon || Mount Lemmon Survey || — || align=right | 3.7 km || 
|-id=782 bgcolor=#C2FFFF
| 224782 ||  || — || May 8, 2006 || Mount Lemmon || Mount Lemmon Survey || L4 || align=right | 13 km || 
|-id=783 bgcolor=#FA8072
| 224783 ||  || — || August 25, 2006 || Socorro || LINEAR || — || align=right data-sort-value="0.82" | 820 m || 
|-id=784 bgcolor=#fefefe
| 224784 ||  || — || August 27, 2006 || Anderson Mesa || LONEOS || — || align=right data-sort-value="0.91" | 910 m || 
|-id=785 bgcolor=#fefefe
| 224785 ||  || — || August 29, 2006 || Anderson Mesa || LONEOS || H || align=right data-sort-value="0.86" | 860 m || 
|-id=786 bgcolor=#fefefe
| 224786 ||  || — || September 16, 2006 || Catalina || CSS || — || align=right | 1.0 km || 
|-id=787 bgcolor=#fefefe
| 224787 ||  || — || September 17, 2006 || Anderson Mesa || LONEOS || H || align=right data-sort-value="0.81" | 810 m || 
|-id=788 bgcolor=#fefefe
| 224788 ||  || — || September 19, 2006 || La Sagra || OAM Obs. || — || align=right data-sort-value="0.78" | 780 m || 
|-id=789 bgcolor=#fefefe
| 224789 ||  || — || September 18, 2006 || Catalina || CSS || — || align=right data-sort-value="0.98" | 980 m || 
|-id=790 bgcolor=#fefefe
| 224790 ||  || — || September 18, 2006 || Kitt Peak || Spacewatch || — || align=right | 1.1 km || 
|-id=791 bgcolor=#fefefe
| 224791 ||  || — || September 27, 2006 || Mount Lemmon || Mount Lemmon Survey || — || align=right | 1.0 km || 
|-id=792 bgcolor=#C2FFFF
| 224792 ||  || — || September 25, 2006 || Apache Point || SDSS || L4 || align=right | 13 km || 
|-id=793 bgcolor=#C2FFFF
| 224793 ||  || — || September 27, 2006 || Apache Point || SDSS || L4 || align=right | 11 km || 
|-id=794 bgcolor=#fefefe
| 224794 ||  || — || September 20, 2006 || Anderson Mesa || LONEOS || V || align=right | 1.4 km || 
|-id=795 bgcolor=#fefefe
| 224795 ||  || — || October 3, 2006 || Mount Lemmon || Mount Lemmon Survey || — || align=right | 1.0 km || 
|-id=796 bgcolor=#fefefe
| 224796 ||  || — || October 12, 2006 || Kitt Peak || Spacewatch || — || align=right data-sort-value="0.86" | 860 m || 
|-id=797 bgcolor=#fefefe
| 224797 ||  || — || October 13, 2006 || Kitt Peak || Spacewatch || — || align=right data-sort-value="0.93" | 930 m || 
|-id=798 bgcolor=#fefefe
| 224798 ||  || — || October 16, 2006 || Catalina || CSS || — || align=right data-sort-value="0.98" | 980 m || 
|-id=799 bgcolor=#fefefe
| 224799 ||  || — || October 16, 2006 || Kitt Peak || Spacewatch || — || align=right data-sort-value="0.93" | 930 m || 
|-id=800 bgcolor=#fefefe
| 224800 ||  || — || October 18, 2006 || Kitt Peak || Spacewatch || FLO || align=right data-sort-value="0.80" | 800 m || 
|}

224801–224900 

|-bgcolor=#fefefe
| 224801 ||  || — || October 19, 2006 || Kitt Peak || Spacewatch || — || align=right data-sort-value="0.68" | 680 m || 
|-id=802 bgcolor=#fefefe
| 224802 ||  || — || October 20, 2006 || Kitt Peak || Spacewatch || — || align=right data-sort-value="0.80" | 800 m || 
|-id=803 bgcolor=#fefefe
| 224803 ||  || — || October 23, 2006 || Kitt Peak || Spacewatch || FLO || align=right data-sort-value="0.90" | 900 m || 
|-id=804 bgcolor=#fefefe
| 224804 ||  || — || October 22, 2006 || Mount Lemmon || Mount Lemmon Survey || V || align=right data-sort-value="0.83" | 830 m || 
|-id=805 bgcolor=#fefefe
| 224805 ||  || — || October 23, 2006 || Kitt Peak || Spacewatch || — || align=right data-sort-value="0.78" | 780 m || 
|-id=806 bgcolor=#fefefe
| 224806 ||  || — || October 28, 2006 || Kitt Peak || Spacewatch || — || align=right data-sort-value="0.95" | 950 m || 
|-id=807 bgcolor=#fefefe
| 224807 ||  || — || October 28, 2006 || Mount Lemmon || Mount Lemmon Survey || V || align=right data-sort-value="0.69" | 690 m || 
|-id=808 bgcolor=#fefefe
| 224808 ||  || — || October 28, 2006 || Mount Lemmon || Mount Lemmon Survey || V || align=right data-sort-value="0.82" | 820 m || 
|-id=809 bgcolor=#fefefe
| 224809 ||  || — || October 28, 2006 || Kitt Peak || Spacewatch || — || align=right data-sort-value="0.83" | 830 m || 
|-id=810 bgcolor=#fefefe
| 224810 ||  || — || October 28, 2006 || Mount Lemmon || Mount Lemmon Survey || — || align=right data-sort-value="0.95" | 950 m || 
|-id=811 bgcolor=#fefefe
| 224811 ||  || — || November 9, 2006 || Kitt Peak || Spacewatch || — || align=right data-sort-value="0.93" | 930 m || 
|-id=812 bgcolor=#fefefe
| 224812 ||  || — || November 10, 2006 || Kitt Peak || Spacewatch || — || align=right data-sort-value="0.99" | 990 m || 
|-id=813 bgcolor=#fefefe
| 224813 ||  || — || November 10, 2006 || Kitt Peak || Spacewatch || — || align=right data-sort-value="0.94" | 940 m || 
|-id=814 bgcolor=#fefefe
| 224814 ||  || — || November 10, 2006 || Kitt Peak || Spacewatch || — || align=right | 1.0 km || 
|-id=815 bgcolor=#fefefe
| 224815 ||  || — || November 11, 2006 || Catalina || CSS || — || align=right | 1.1 km || 
|-id=816 bgcolor=#fefefe
| 224816 ||  || — || November 13, 2006 || Kitt Peak || Spacewatch || NYS || align=right data-sort-value="0.99" | 990 m || 
|-id=817 bgcolor=#fefefe
| 224817 ||  || — || November 13, 2006 || Catalina || CSS || — || align=right | 1.1 km || 
|-id=818 bgcolor=#fefefe
| 224818 ||  || — || November 11, 2006 || Kitt Peak || Spacewatch || FLO || align=right data-sort-value="0.75" | 750 m || 
|-id=819 bgcolor=#fefefe
| 224819 ||  || — || November 11, 2006 || Kitt Peak || Spacewatch || — || align=right data-sort-value="0.89" | 890 m || 
|-id=820 bgcolor=#fefefe
| 224820 ||  || — || November 14, 2006 || Kitt Peak || Spacewatch || NYS || align=right | 1.0 km || 
|-id=821 bgcolor=#fefefe
| 224821 ||  || — || November 15, 2006 || Mount Lemmon || Mount Lemmon Survey || — || align=right | 1.1 km || 
|-id=822 bgcolor=#fefefe
| 224822 ||  || — || November 10, 2006 || Kitt Peak || Spacewatch || — || align=right | 1.1 km || 
|-id=823 bgcolor=#fefefe
| 224823 ||  || — || November 13, 2006 || Kitt Peak || Spacewatch || — || align=right | 1.1 km || 
|-id=824 bgcolor=#fefefe
| 224824 ||  || — || November 15, 2006 || Kitt Peak || Spacewatch || V || align=right data-sort-value="0.91" | 910 m || 
|-id=825 bgcolor=#fefefe
| 224825 ||  || — || November 11, 2006 || Kitt Peak || Spacewatch || V || align=right data-sort-value="0.71" | 710 m || 
|-id=826 bgcolor=#fefefe
| 224826 ||  || — || November 16, 2006 || Socorro || LINEAR || — || align=right data-sort-value="0.88" | 880 m || 
|-id=827 bgcolor=#fefefe
| 224827 ||  || — || November 17, 2006 || Mount Lemmon || Mount Lemmon Survey || FLO || align=right data-sort-value="0.89" | 890 m || 
|-id=828 bgcolor=#fefefe
| 224828 ||  || — || November 16, 2006 || Kitt Peak || Spacewatch || — || align=right data-sort-value="0.65" | 650 m || 
|-id=829 bgcolor=#fefefe
| 224829 ||  || — || November 18, 2006 || Kitt Peak || Spacewatch || — || align=right data-sort-value="0.96" | 960 m || 
|-id=830 bgcolor=#fefefe
| 224830 ||  || — || November 20, 2006 || Kitt Peak || Spacewatch || FLO || align=right data-sort-value="0.92" | 920 m || 
|-id=831 bgcolor=#fefefe
| 224831 Neeffisis ||  ||  || November 27, 2006 || Taunus || E. Schwab, R. Kling || — || align=right data-sort-value="0.92" | 920 m || 
|-id=832 bgcolor=#fefefe
| 224832 ||  || — || November 22, 2006 || Kitt Peak || Spacewatch || — || align=right | 1.3 km || 
|-id=833 bgcolor=#fefefe
| 224833 ||  || — || November 23, 2006 || Kitt Peak || Spacewatch || — || align=right data-sort-value="0.65" | 650 m || 
|-id=834 bgcolor=#fefefe
| 224834 ||  || — || November 23, 2006 || Kitt Peak || Spacewatch || NYS || align=right data-sort-value="0.81" | 810 m || 
|-id=835 bgcolor=#fefefe
| 224835 ||  || — || November 24, 2006 || Mount Lemmon || Mount Lemmon Survey || NYS || align=right | 1.0 km || 
|-id=836 bgcolor=#fefefe
| 224836 ||  || — || November 22, 2006 || Mount Lemmon || Mount Lemmon Survey || V || align=right data-sort-value="0.99" | 990 m || 
|-id=837 bgcolor=#fefefe
| 224837 ||  || — || November 29, 2006 || Socorro || LINEAR || — || align=right | 1.4 km || 
|-id=838 bgcolor=#fefefe
| 224838 ||  || — || November 16, 2006 || Kitt Peak || Spacewatch || — || align=right | 1.3 km || 
|-id=839 bgcolor=#fefefe
| 224839 ||  || — || December 10, 2006 || Kitt Peak || Spacewatch || — || align=right | 1.00 km || 
|-id=840 bgcolor=#fefefe
| 224840 ||  || — || December 10, 2006 || Kitt Peak || Spacewatch || — || align=right | 1.0 km || 
|-id=841 bgcolor=#E9E9E9
| 224841 ||  || — || December 10, 2006 || Kitt Peak || Spacewatch || ADE || align=right | 3.4 km || 
|-id=842 bgcolor=#fefefe
| 224842 ||  || — || December 10, 2006 || Pla D'Arguines || R. Ferrando || — || align=right | 1.2 km || 
|-id=843 bgcolor=#fefefe
| 224843 ||  || — || December 11, 2006 || Kitt Peak || Spacewatch || — || align=right | 1.2 km || 
|-id=844 bgcolor=#fefefe
| 224844 ||  || — || December 10, 2006 || Kitt Peak || Spacewatch || FLO || align=right data-sort-value="0.67" | 670 m || 
|-id=845 bgcolor=#fefefe
| 224845 ||  || — || December 11, 2006 || Kitt Peak || Spacewatch || — || align=right | 1.0 km || 
|-id=846 bgcolor=#E9E9E9
| 224846 ||  || — || December 13, 2006 || Mount Lemmon || Mount Lemmon Survey || — || align=right | 1.3 km || 
|-id=847 bgcolor=#fefefe
| 224847 ||  || — || December 13, 2006 || Mount Lemmon || Mount Lemmon Survey || — || align=right | 1.1 km || 
|-id=848 bgcolor=#fefefe
| 224848 ||  || — || December 14, 2006 || Mount Lemmon || Mount Lemmon Survey || — || align=right data-sort-value="0.93" | 930 m || 
|-id=849 bgcolor=#fefefe
| 224849 ||  || — || December 14, 2006 || Kitt Peak || Spacewatch || FLO || align=right data-sort-value="0.84" | 840 m || 
|-id=850 bgcolor=#fefefe
| 224850 ||  || — || December 16, 2006 || Mount Lemmon || Mount Lemmon Survey || V || align=right | 1.1 km || 
|-id=851 bgcolor=#fefefe
| 224851 ||  || — || December 20, 2006 || Mount Lemmon || Mount Lemmon Survey || NYS || align=right data-sort-value="0.83" | 830 m || 
|-id=852 bgcolor=#fefefe
| 224852 ||  || — || December 20, 2006 || Palomar || NEAT || H || align=right | 1.2 km || 
|-id=853 bgcolor=#fefefe
| 224853 ||  || — || December 21, 2006 || Mount Lemmon || Mount Lemmon Survey || — || align=right data-sort-value="0.96" | 960 m || 
|-id=854 bgcolor=#fefefe
| 224854 ||  || — || December 23, 2006 || Catalina || CSS || — || align=right | 1.1 km || 
|-id=855 bgcolor=#fefefe
| 224855 ||  || — || December 21, 2006 || Kitt Peak || Spacewatch || — || align=right | 1.2 km || 
|-id=856 bgcolor=#fefefe
| 224856 ||  || — || December 21, 2006 || Kitt Peak || Spacewatch || — || align=right | 1.0 km || 
|-id=857 bgcolor=#fefefe
| 224857 ||  || — || December 21, 2006 || Kitt Peak || Spacewatch || NYS || align=right data-sort-value="0.94" | 940 m || 
|-id=858 bgcolor=#fefefe
| 224858 ||  || — || December 28, 2006 || Piszkéstető || K. Sárneczky || — || align=right data-sort-value="0.97" | 970 m || 
|-id=859 bgcolor=#fefefe
| 224859 ||  || — || December 21, 2006 || Kitt Peak || Spacewatch || NYS || align=right | 1.7 km || 
|-id=860 bgcolor=#E9E9E9
| 224860 ||  || — || December 24, 2006 || Kitt Peak || Spacewatch || — || align=right | 1.9 km || 
|-id=861 bgcolor=#E9E9E9
| 224861 ||  || — || December 16, 2006 || Mount Lemmon || Mount Lemmon Survey || GEF || align=right | 1.9 km || 
|-id=862 bgcolor=#fefefe
| 224862 ||  || — || January 9, 2007 || Kitt Peak || Spacewatch || MAS || align=right | 1.2 km || 
|-id=863 bgcolor=#E9E9E9
| 224863 ||  || — || January 13, 2007 || Altschwendt || W. Ries || — || align=right | 3.6 km || 
|-id=864 bgcolor=#E9E9E9
| 224864 ||  || — || January 9, 2007 || Mount Lemmon || Mount Lemmon Survey || — || align=right | 1.7 km || 
|-id=865 bgcolor=#fefefe
| 224865 ||  || — || January 9, 2007 || Mount Lemmon || Mount Lemmon Survey || — || align=right data-sort-value="0.94" | 940 m || 
|-id=866 bgcolor=#fefefe
| 224866 ||  || — || January 8, 2007 || Catalina || CSS || NYS || align=right data-sort-value="0.91" | 910 m || 
|-id=867 bgcolor=#fefefe
| 224867 ||  || — || January 10, 2007 || Kitt Peak || Spacewatch || — || align=right | 1.2 km || 
|-id=868 bgcolor=#fefefe
| 224868 ||  || — || January 10, 2007 || Mount Lemmon || Mount Lemmon Survey || FLO || align=right data-sort-value="0.81" | 810 m || 
|-id=869 bgcolor=#fefefe
| 224869 ||  || — || January 15, 2007 || Catalina || CSS || NYS || align=right data-sort-value="0.88" | 880 m || 
|-id=870 bgcolor=#E9E9E9
| 224870 ||  || — || January 9, 2007 || Kitt Peak || Spacewatch || — || align=right | 1.3 km || 
|-id=871 bgcolor=#fefefe
| 224871 ||  || — || January 10, 2007 || Mount Lemmon || Mount Lemmon Survey || — || align=right | 1.1 km || 
|-id=872 bgcolor=#fefefe
| 224872 ||  || — || January 17, 2007 || Kitt Peak || Spacewatch || V || align=right data-sort-value="0.97" | 970 m || 
|-id=873 bgcolor=#fefefe
| 224873 ||  || — || January 24, 2007 || Mount Lemmon || Mount Lemmon Survey || — || align=right data-sort-value="0.93" | 930 m || 
|-id=874 bgcolor=#fefefe
| 224874 ||  || — || January 24, 2007 || Catalina || CSS || — || align=right data-sort-value="0.83" | 830 m || 
|-id=875 bgcolor=#fefefe
| 224875 ||  || — || January 24, 2007 || Catalina || CSS || NYS || align=right | 1.0 km || 
|-id=876 bgcolor=#fefefe
| 224876 ||  || — || January 24, 2007 || Catalina || CSS || NYS || align=right data-sort-value="0.91" | 910 m || 
|-id=877 bgcolor=#fefefe
| 224877 ||  || — || January 25, 2007 || Catalina || CSS || — || align=right | 1.2 km || 
|-id=878 bgcolor=#fefefe
| 224878 ||  || — || January 26, 2007 || Kitt Peak || Spacewatch || — || align=right | 1.0 km || 
|-id=879 bgcolor=#d6d6d6
| 224879 ||  || — || January 27, 2007 || Kitt Peak || Spacewatch || — || align=right | 5.1 km || 
|-id=880 bgcolor=#fefefe
| 224880 ||  || — || January 27, 2007 || Kitt Peak || Spacewatch || SUL || align=right | 2.5 km || 
|-id=881 bgcolor=#fefefe
| 224881 ||  || — || January 28, 2007 || Kitt Peak || Spacewatch || FLO || align=right | 1.0 km || 
|-id=882 bgcolor=#E9E9E9
| 224882 ||  || — || January 17, 2007 || Mount Lemmon || Mount Lemmon Survey || — || align=right | 1.6 km || 
|-id=883 bgcolor=#fefefe
| 224883 ||  || — || January 27, 2007 || Mount Lemmon || Mount Lemmon Survey || — || align=right | 1.1 km || 
|-id=884 bgcolor=#fefefe
| 224884 ||  || — || January 29, 2007 || Kitt Peak || Spacewatch || NYS || align=right data-sort-value="0.77" | 770 m || 
|-id=885 bgcolor=#fefefe
| 224885 ||  || — || January 17, 2007 || Kitt Peak || Spacewatch || MAS || align=right data-sort-value="0.76" | 760 m || 
|-id=886 bgcolor=#fefefe
| 224886 ||  || — || February 5, 2007 || Palomar || NEAT || NYS || align=right data-sort-value="0.80" | 800 m || 
|-id=887 bgcolor=#fefefe
| 224887 ||  || — || February 6, 2007 || Kitt Peak || Spacewatch || NYS || align=right data-sort-value="0.94" | 940 m || 
|-id=888 bgcolor=#fefefe
| 224888 Cochingchu ||  ||  || February 5, 2007 || Lulin Observatory || Q.-z. Ye, H.-C. Lin || — || align=right data-sort-value="0.76" | 760 m || 
|-id=889 bgcolor=#fefefe
| 224889 ||  || — || February 6, 2007 || Mount Lemmon || Mount Lemmon Survey || — || align=right data-sort-value="0.84" | 840 m || 
|-id=890 bgcolor=#fefefe
| 224890 ||  || — || February 6, 2007 || Mount Lemmon || Mount Lemmon Survey || MAS || align=right data-sort-value="0.81" | 810 m || 
|-id=891 bgcolor=#fefefe
| 224891 ||  || — || February 7, 2007 || Mount Lemmon || Mount Lemmon Survey || NYS || align=right data-sort-value="0.85" | 850 m || 
|-id=892 bgcolor=#fefefe
| 224892 ||  || — || February 7, 2007 || Mount Lemmon || Mount Lemmon Survey || FLO || align=right | 1.7 km || 
|-id=893 bgcolor=#fefefe
| 224893 ||  || — || February 5, 2007 || Palomar || NEAT || V || align=right data-sort-value="0.87" | 870 m || 
|-id=894 bgcolor=#fefefe
| 224894 ||  || — || February 6, 2007 || Palomar || NEAT || — || align=right | 1.2 km || 
|-id=895 bgcolor=#fefefe
| 224895 ||  || — || February 6, 2007 || Palomar || NEAT || V || align=right | 1.2 km || 
|-id=896 bgcolor=#E9E9E9
| 224896 ||  || — || February 6, 2007 || Mount Lemmon || Mount Lemmon Survey || — || align=right | 2.8 km || 
|-id=897 bgcolor=#fefefe
| 224897 ||  || — || February 8, 2007 || Kitt Peak || Spacewatch || NYS || align=right | 2.8 km || 
|-id=898 bgcolor=#E9E9E9
| 224898 ||  || — || February 6, 2007 || Kitt Peak || Spacewatch || — || align=right | 2.0 km || 
|-id=899 bgcolor=#fefefe
| 224899 ||  || — || February 7, 2007 || Kitt Peak || Spacewatch || NYS || align=right | 1.9 km || 
|-id=900 bgcolor=#fefefe
| 224900 ||  || — || February 8, 2007 || Palomar || NEAT || — || align=right | 1.7 km || 
|}

224901–225000 

|-bgcolor=#E9E9E9
| 224901 ||  || — || February 8, 2007 || Palomar || NEAT || CLO || align=right | 4.2 km || 
|-id=902 bgcolor=#E9E9E9
| 224902 ||  || — || February 14, 2007 || Lulin || C.-S. Lin, Q.-z. Ye || — || align=right | 2.1 km || 
|-id=903 bgcolor=#fefefe
| 224903 ||  || — || February 10, 2007 || Catalina || CSS || — || align=right | 1.7 km || 
|-id=904 bgcolor=#d6d6d6
| 224904 ||  || — || February 15, 2007 || Palomar || NEAT || — || align=right | 4.0 km || 
|-id=905 bgcolor=#d6d6d6
| 224905 ||  || — || February 8, 2007 || Kitt Peak || Spacewatch || 628 || align=right | 2.2 km || 
|-id=906 bgcolor=#d6d6d6
| 224906 ||  || — || February 7, 2007 || Mount Lemmon || Mount Lemmon Survey || — || align=right | 7.0 km || 
|-id=907 bgcolor=#fefefe
| 224907 ||  || — || February 6, 2007 || Kitt Peak || Spacewatch || — || align=right | 1.1 km || 
|-id=908 bgcolor=#fefefe
| 224908 ||  || — || February 8, 2007 || Mount Lemmon || Mount Lemmon Survey || — || align=right | 1.3 km || 
|-id=909 bgcolor=#E9E9E9
| 224909 ||  || — || February 17, 2007 || Catalina || CSS || — || align=right | 3.2 km || 
|-id=910 bgcolor=#fefefe
| 224910 ||  || — || February 17, 2007 || Kitt Peak || Spacewatch || — || align=right data-sort-value="0.93" | 930 m || 
|-id=911 bgcolor=#fefefe
| 224911 ||  || — || February 16, 2007 || Palomar || NEAT || — || align=right data-sort-value="0.77" | 770 m || 
|-id=912 bgcolor=#E9E9E9
| 224912 ||  || — || February 16, 2007 || Palomar || NEAT || — || align=right | 1.9 km || 
|-id=913 bgcolor=#E9E9E9
| 224913 ||  || — || February 17, 2007 || Kitt Peak || Spacewatch || — || align=right | 2.3 km || 
|-id=914 bgcolor=#E9E9E9
| 224914 ||  || — || February 17, 2007 || Kitt Peak || Spacewatch || — || align=right | 2.2 km || 
|-id=915 bgcolor=#E9E9E9
| 224915 ||  || — || February 17, 2007 || Kitt Peak || Spacewatch || — || align=right | 1.1 km || 
|-id=916 bgcolor=#E9E9E9
| 224916 ||  || — || February 17, 2007 || Kitt Peak || Spacewatch || — || align=right | 2.0 km || 
|-id=917 bgcolor=#d6d6d6
| 224917 ||  || — || February 17, 2007 || Kitt Peak || Spacewatch || KOR || align=right | 2.1 km || 
|-id=918 bgcolor=#E9E9E9
| 224918 ||  || — || February 17, 2007 || Kitt Peak || Spacewatch || — || align=right | 2.2 km || 
|-id=919 bgcolor=#E9E9E9
| 224919 ||  || — || February 17, 2007 || Kitt Peak || Spacewatch || — || align=right | 1.1 km || 
|-id=920 bgcolor=#fefefe
| 224920 ||  || — || February 17, 2007 || Kitt Peak || Spacewatch || MAS || align=right data-sort-value="0.99" | 990 m || 
|-id=921 bgcolor=#E9E9E9
| 224921 ||  || — || February 17, 2007 || Kitt Peak || Spacewatch || — || align=right | 2.3 km || 
|-id=922 bgcolor=#E9E9E9
| 224922 ||  || — || February 17, 2007 || Kitt Peak || Spacewatch || — || align=right | 2.0 km || 
|-id=923 bgcolor=#d6d6d6
| 224923 ||  || — || February 17, 2007 || Kitt Peak || Spacewatch || — || align=right | 3.8 km || 
|-id=924 bgcolor=#d6d6d6
| 224924 ||  || — || February 17, 2007 || Kitt Peak || Spacewatch || EOS || align=right | 2.7 km || 
|-id=925 bgcolor=#d6d6d6
| 224925 ||  || — || February 17, 2007 || Kitt Peak || Spacewatch || KOR || align=right | 2.5 km || 
|-id=926 bgcolor=#FFC2E0
| 224926 ||  || — || February 22, 2007 || Siding Spring || SSS || APO +1km || align=right | 1.1 km || 
|-id=927 bgcolor=#fefefe
| 224927 ||  || — || February 16, 2007 || Palomar || NEAT || NYS || align=right data-sort-value="0.91" | 910 m || 
|-id=928 bgcolor=#fefefe
| 224928 ||  || — || February 16, 2007 || Palomar || NEAT || — || align=right | 1.2 km || 
|-id=929 bgcolor=#fefefe
| 224929 ||  || — || February 16, 2007 || Palomar || NEAT || MAS || align=right | 1.0 km || 
|-id=930 bgcolor=#fefefe
| 224930 ||  || — || February 19, 2007 || Mount Lemmon || Mount Lemmon Survey || — || align=right | 1.9 km || 
|-id=931 bgcolor=#fefefe
| 224931 ||  || — || February 21, 2007 || Mount Lemmon || Mount Lemmon Survey || — || align=right data-sort-value="0.86" | 860 m || 
|-id=932 bgcolor=#E9E9E9
| 224932 ||  || — || February 21, 2007 || Kitt Peak || Spacewatch || — || align=right | 3.6 km || 
|-id=933 bgcolor=#E9E9E9
| 224933 ||  || — || February 21, 2007 || Kitt Peak || Spacewatch || — || align=right | 3.0 km || 
|-id=934 bgcolor=#E9E9E9
| 224934 ||  || — || February 22, 2007 || Anderson Mesa || LONEOS || — || align=right | 3.0 km || 
|-id=935 bgcolor=#E9E9E9
| 224935 ||  || — || February 19, 2007 || Farra d'Isonzo || Farra d'Isonzo || JUN || align=right | 1.5 km || 
|-id=936 bgcolor=#E9E9E9
| 224936 ||  || — || February 21, 2007 || Kitt Peak || Spacewatch || — || align=right | 2.3 km || 
|-id=937 bgcolor=#fefefe
| 224937 ||  || — || February 21, 2007 || Kitt Peak || Spacewatch || MAS || align=right data-sort-value="0.76" | 760 m || 
|-id=938 bgcolor=#E9E9E9
| 224938 ||  || — || February 21, 2007 || Kitt Peak || Spacewatch || — || align=right | 2.0 km || 
|-id=939 bgcolor=#E9E9E9
| 224939 ||  || — || February 21, 2007 || Kitt Peak || Spacewatch || ADE || align=right | 2.8 km || 
|-id=940 bgcolor=#E9E9E9
| 224940 ||  || — || February 21, 2007 || Kitt Peak || Spacewatch || — || align=right | 3.1 km || 
|-id=941 bgcolor=#fefefe
| 224941 ||  || — || February 21, 2007 || Kitt Peak || Spacewatch || MAS || align=right data-sort-value="0.82" | 820 m || 
|-id=942 bgcolor=#E9E9E9
| 224942 ||  || — || February 21, 2007 || Mount Lemmon || Mount Lemmon Survey || — || align=right | 1.3 km || 
|-id=943 bgcolor=#E9E9E9
| 224943 ||  || — || February 23, 2007 || Kitt Peak || Spacewatch || NEM || align=right | 3.2 km || 
|-id=944 bgcolor=#fefefe
| 224944 ||  || — || February 25, 2007 || Mount Lemmon || Mount Lemmon Survey || NYS || align=right | 1.0 km || 
|-id=945 bgcolor=#fefefe
| 224945 ||  || — || February 24, 2007 || Nyukasa || Mount Nyukasa Stn. || MAS || align=right | 1.0 km || 
|-id=946 bgcolor=#d6d6d6
| 224946 ||  || — || February 25, 2007 || Mount Lemmon || Mount Lemmon Survey || KAR || align=right | 1.8 km || 
|-id=947 bgcolor=#E9E9E9
| 224947 ||  || — || February 22, 2007 || Kitt Peak || Spacewatch || — || align=right | 2.4 km || 
|-id=948 bgcolor=#d6d6d6
| 224948 ||  || — || February 23, 2007 || Mount Lemmon || Mount Lemmon Survey || — || align=right | 3.4 km || 
|-id=949 bgcolor=#E9E9E9
| 224949 ||  || — || February 17, 2007 || Kitt Peak || Spacewatch || AST || align=right | 2.1 km || 
|-id=950 bgcolor=#E9E9E9
| 224950 ||  || — || February 23, 2007 || Catalina || CSS || EUN || align=right | 1.3 km || 
|-id=951 bgcolor=#E9E9E9
| 224951 ||  || — || March 3, 2007 || Nanchuan || Nanchuan Obs. || ADE || align=right | 3.9 km || 
|-id=952 bgcolor=#fefefe
| 224952 ||  || — || March 9, 2007 || Catalina || CSS || — || align=right | 1.2 km || 
|-id=953 bgcolor=#E9E9E9
| 224953 ||  || — || March 9, 2007 || Mount Lemmon || Mount Lemmon Survey || HEN || align=right | 1.4 km || 
|-id=954 bgcolor=#d6d6d6
| 224954 ||  || — || March 9, 2007 || Mount Lemmon || Mount Lemmon Survey || — || align=right | 4.3 km || 
|-id=955 bgcolor=#d6d6d6
| 224955 ||  || — || March 9, 2007 || Kitt Peak || Spacewatch || — || align=right | 4.7 km || 
|-id=956 bgcolor=#E9E9E9
| 224956 ||  || — || March 9, 2007 || Catalina || CSS || — || align=right | 2.2 km || 
|-id=957 bgcolor=#E9E9E9
| 224957 ||  || — || March 9, 2007 || Catalina || CSS || — || align=right | 1.8 km || 
|-id=958 bgcolor=#d6d6d6
| 224958 ||  || — || March 9, 2007 || Palomar || NEAT || — || align=right | 3.5 km || 
|-id=959 bgcolor=#fefefe
| 224959 ||  || — || March 10, 2007 || Kitt Peak || Spacewatch || MAS || align=right data-sort-value="0.87" | 870 m || 
|-id=960 bgcolor=#d6d6d6
| 224960 ||  || — || March 10, 2007 || Mount Lemmon || Mount Lemmon Survey || HYG || align=right | 4.1 km || 
|-id=961 bgcolor=#E9E9E9
| 224961 ||  || — || March 10, 2007 || Mount Lemmon || Mount Lemmon Survey || — || align=right | 2.6 km || 
|-id=962 bgcolor=#fefefe
| 224962 Michaelgrünewald ||  ||  || March 11, 2007 || Wildberg || R. Apitzsch || — || align=right | 1.3 km || 
|-id=963 bgcolor=#E9E9E9
| 224963 ||  || — || March 10, 2007 || Kitt Peak || Spacewatch || — || align=right | 2.7 km || 
|-id=964 bgcolor=#E9E9E9
| 224964 ||  || — || March 11, 2007 || Catalina || CSS || — || align=right | 2.3 km || 
|-id=965 bgcolor=#d6d6d6
| 224965 ||  || — || March 9, 2007 || Kitt Peak || Spacewatch || — || align=right | 5.5 km || 
|-id=966 bgcolor=#d6d6d6
| 224966 ||  || — || March 9, 2007 || Kitt Peak || Spacewatch || — || align=right | 4.2 km || 
|-id=967 bgcolor=#fefefe
| 224967 ||  || — || March 9, 2007 || Palomar || NEAT || — || align=right | 1.4 km || 
|-id=968 bgcolor=#d6d6d6
| 224968 ||  || — || March 9, 2007 || Kitt Peak || Spacewatch || — || align=right | 3.9 km || 
|-id=969 bgcolor=#d6d6d6
| 224969 ||  || — || March 9, 2007 || Kitt Peak || Spacewatch || — || align=right | 4.6 km || 
|-id=970 bgcolor=#E9E9E9
| 224970 ||  || — || March 11, 2007 || Catalina || CSS || — || align=right | 3.6 km || 
|-id=971 bgcolor=#d6d6d6
| 224971 ||  || — || March 11, 2007 || Mount Lemmon || Mount Lemmon Survey || — || align=right | 4.1 km || 
|-id=972 bgcolor=#d6d6d6
| 224972 ||  || — || March 11, 2007 || Mount Lemmon || Mount Lemmon Survey || — || align=right | 5.5 km || 
|-id=973 bgcolor=#d6d6d6
| 224973 ||  || — || March 11, 2007 || Mount Lemmon || Mount Lemmon Survey || — || align=right | 4.9 km || 
|-id=974 bgcolor=#d6d6d6
| 224974 ||  || — || March 11, 2007 || Mount Lemmon || Mount Lemmon Survey || KOR || align=right | 2.1 km || 
|-id=975 bgcolor=#E9E9E9
| 224975 ||  || — || March 9, 2007 || Catalina || CSS || — || align=right | 2.9 km || 
|-id=976 bgcolor=#E9E9E9
| 224976 ||  || — || March 10, 2007 || Kitt Peak || Spacewatch || HOF || align=right | 4.0 km || 
|-id=977 bgcolor=#d6d6d6
| 224977 ||  || — || March 10, 2007 || Kitt Peak || Spacewatch || HYG || align=right | 3.9 km || 
|-id=978 bgcolor=#d6d6d6
| 224978 ||  || — || March 10, 2007 || Kitt Peak || Spacewatch || — || align=right | 3.0 km || 
|-id=979 bgcolor=#E9E9E9
| 224979 ||  || — || March 10, 2007 || Kitt Peak || Spacewatch || — || align=right | 2.2 km || 
|-id=980 bgcolor=#d6d6d6
| 224980 ||  || — || March 10, 2007 || Kitt Peak || Spacewatch || KOR || align=right | 1.9 km || 
|-id=981 bgcolor=#E9E9E9
| 224981 ||  || — || March 10, 2007 || Mount Lemmon || Mount Lemmon Survey || — || align=right | 2.0 km || 
|-id=982 bgcolor=#fefefe
| 224982 ||  || — || March 11, 2007 || Kitt Peak || Spacewatch || NYS || align=right data-sort-value="0.88" | 880 m || 
|-id=983 bgcolor=#fefefe
| 224983 ||  || — || March 11, 2007 || Kitt Peak || Spacewatch || NYS || align=right data-sort-value="0.84" | 840 m || 
|-id=984 bgcolor=#d6d6d6
| 224984 ||  || — || March 12, 2007 || Catalina || CSS || EUP || align=right | 4.4 km || 
|-id=985 bgcolor=#E9E9E9
| 224985 ||  || — || March 10, 2007 || Mount Lemmon || Mount Lemmon Survey || — || align=right | 2.1 km || 
|-id=986 bgcolor=#fefefe
| 224986 ||  || — || March 10, 2007 || Mount Lemmon || Mount Lemmon Survey || MAS || align=right data-sort-value="0.90" | 900 m || 
|-id=987 bgcolor=#d6d6d6
| 224987 ||  || — || March 10, 2007 || Mount Lemmon || Mount Lemmon Survey || — || align=right | 3.3 km || 
|-id=988 bgcolor=#fefefe
| 224988 ||  || — || March 11, 2007 || Mount Lemmon || Mount Lemmon Survey || MAS || align=right data-sort-value="0.72" | 720 m || 
|-id=989 bgcolor=#E9E9E9
| 224989 ||  || — || March 11, 2007 || Kitt Peak || Spacewatch || — || align=right | 3.3 km || 
|-id=990 bgcolor=#d6d6d6
| 224990 ||  || — || March 11, 2007 || Kitt Peak || Spacewatch || EOS || align=right | 3.2 km || 
|-id=991 bgcolor=#E9E9E9
| 224991 ||  || — || March 11, 2007 || Kitt Peak || Spacewatch || — || align=right | 1.2 km || 
|-id=992 bgcolor=#E9E9E9
| 224992 ||  || — || March 11, 2007 || Kitt Peak || Spacewatch || — || align=right | 3.3 km || 
|-id=993 bgcolor=#d6d6d6
| 224993 ||  || — || March 9, 2007 || Mount Lemmon || Mount Lemmon Survey || — || align=right | 3.3 km || 
|-id=994 bgcolor=#fefefe
| 224994 ||  || — || March 9, 2007 || Mount Lemmon || Mount Lemmon Survey || — || align=right data-sort-value="0.95" | 950 m || 
|-id=995 bgcolor=#d6d6d6
| 224995 ||  || — || March 9, 2007 || Mount Lemmon || Mount Lemmon Survey || THM || align=right | 3.1 km || 
|-id=996 bgcolor=#E9E9E9
| 224996 ||  || — || March 9, 2007 || Mount Lemmon || Mount Lemmon Survey || HEN || align=right | 1.4 km || 
|-id=997 bgcolor=#E9E9E9
| 224997 ||  || — || March 10, 2007 || Palomar || NEAT || — || align=right | 1.1 km || 
|-id=998 bgcolor=#d6d6d6
| 224998 ||  || — || March 10, 2007 || Mount Lemmon || Mount Lemmon Survey || — || align=right | 2.8 km || 
|-id=999 bgcolor=#fefefe
| 224999 ||  || — || March 12, 2007 || Kitt Peak || Spacewatch || NYS || align=right data-sort-value="0.96" | 960 m || 
|-id=000 bgcolor=#d6d6d6
| 225000 ||  || — || March 12, 2007 || Kitt Peak || Spacewatch || URS || align=right | 4.3 km || 
|}

References

External links 
 Discovery Circumstances: Numbered Minor Planets (220001)–(225000) (IAU Minor Planet Center)

0224